This is a partial list of unnumbered minor planets for principal provisional designations assigned between 16 October and 31 December 2000. , a total of 431 bodies remain unnumbered for this period. Objects for this year are listed on the following pages: A–E · F–O · P–R · S–T and U–Y. Also see previous and next year.

U 

|- id="2000 UD" bgcolor=#fefefe
| 0 || 2000 UD || HUN || 18.63 || data-sort-value="0.56" | 560 m || multiple || 2000–2021 || 09 Apr 2021 || 107 || align=left | Disc.: SpacewatchAlt.: 2011 SM265 || 
|- id="2000 UE" bgcolor=#fefefe
| 0 || 2000 UE || HUN || 17.8 || data-sort-value="0.82" | 820 m || multiple || 2000–2021 || 09 Jun 2021 || 233 || align=left | Disc.: Ondřejov Obs. || 
|- id="2000 UH" bgcolor=#d6d6d6
| 0 || 2000 UH || MBA-O || 15.6 || 4.2 km || multiple || 2000–2021 || 14 May 2021 || 121 || align=left | Disc.: LINEARAlt.: 2017 QN34 || 
|- id="2000 UJ11" bgcolor=#FA8072
| 0 ||  || MCA || 17.50 || data-sort-value="0.94" | 940 m || multiple || 2000–2022 || 24 Jan 2022 || 158 || align=left | Disc.: LINEARAlt.: 2018 CQ || 
|- id="2000 UK11" bgcolor=#FFC2E0
| 1 ||  || ATE || 25.3 || data-sort-value="0.031" | 31 m || multiple || 2000–2015 || 12 Sep 2015 || 66 || align=left | Disc.: LINEAR || 
|- id="2000 UD14" bgcolor=#fefefe
| 1 ||  || MBA-I || 19.4 || data-sort-value="0.39" | 390 m || multiple || 2000–2019 || 22 Aug 2019 || 41 || align=left | Disc.: SpacewatchAlt.: 2016 TL83 || 
|- id="2000 UV15" bgcolor=#fefefe
| 0 ||  || MBA-I || 18.92 || data-sort-value="0.49" | 490 m || multiple || 2000–2021 || 17 May 2021 || 103 || align=left | Disc.: SpacewatchAlt.: 2011 UD353 || 
|- id="2000 UY15" bgcolor=#fefefe
| 0 ||  || MBA-I || 17.5 || data-sort-value="0.94" | 940 m || multiple || 2000–2021 || 23 Jan 2021 || 92 || align=left | Disc.: Spacewatch || 
|- id="2000 UQ16" bgcolor=#FA8072
| – ||  || MCA || 21.0 || data-sort-value="0.19" | 190 m || single || 21 days || 17 Nov 2000 || 14 || align=left | Disc.: Spacewatch || 
|- id="2000 UR16" bgcolor=#FFC2E0
| 7 ||  || ATE || 23.9 || data-sort-value="0.059" | 59 m || single || 33 days || 01 Dec 2000 || 63 || align=left | Disc.: Ondřejov Obs. || 
|- id="2000 US16" bgcolor=#FA8072
| 0 ||  || MCA || 18.2 || data-sort-value="0.68" | 680 m || multiple || 2000–2020 || 28 Jan 2020 || 128 || align=left | Disc.: LINEARAlt.: 2019 UA || 
|- id="2000 UH30" bgcolor=#FA8072
| E ||  || MCA || 18.3 || data-sort-value="0.65" | 650 m || single || 2 days || 02 Nov 2000 || 15 || align=left | Disc.: LINEAR || 
|- id="2000 UO30" bgcolor=#FFC2E0
| 0 ||  || APO || 23.9 || data-sort-value="0.059" | 59 m || multiple || 2000–2017 || 16 Nov 2017 || 83 || align=left | Disc.: LINEAR || 
|- id="2000 UQ30" bgcolor=#FFC2E0
| 6 ||  || APO || 22.1 || data-sort-value="0.14" | 140 m || single || 52 days || 22 Dec 2000 || 46 || align=left | Disc.: LINEAR || 
|- id="2000 UB31" bgcolor=#fefefe
| 0 ||  || MBA-I || 18.6 || data-sort-value="0.57" | 570 m || multiple || 2000–2020 || 05 Jan 2020 || 47 || align=left | Disc.: Spacewatch || 
|- id="2000 UC31" bgcolor=#E9E9E9
| 0 ||  || MBA-M || 17.88 || data-sort-value="0.79" | 790 m || multiple || 2000–2021 || 30 Nov 2021 || 101 || align=left | Disc.: SpacewatchAlt.: 2015 FR224 || 
|- id="2000 UN31" bgcolor=#fefefe
| 0 ||  || MBA-I || 18.49 || data-sort-value="0.60" | 600 m || multiple || 2000–2021 || 07 Apr 2021 || 47 || align=left | Disc.: SpacewatchAdded on 22 July 2020 || 
|- id="2000 US31" bgcolor=#d6d6d6
| 0 ||  || MBA-O || 17.07 || 2.1 km || multiple || 2000–2021 || 30 Nov 2021 || 82 || align=left | Disc.: SpacewatchAdded on 21 August 2021 || 
|- id="2000 UV31" bgcolor=#fefefe
| 0 ||  || MBA-I || 18.8 || data-sort-value="0.52" | 520 m || multiple || 2000–2020 || 02 Feb 2020 || 43 || align=left | Disc.: Spacewatch || 
|- id="2000 UM32" bgcolor=#fefefe
| 0 ||  || MBA-I || 17.67 || data-sort-value="0.87" | 870 m || multiple || 2000–2021 || 14 May 2021 || 128 || align=left | Disc.: SpacewatchAlt.: 2015 VG135 || 
|- id="2000 UY33" bgcolor=#FFC2E0
| 3 ||  || AMO || 22.3 || data-sort-value="0.12" | 120 m || multiple || 2000–2013 || 04 May 2013 || 52 || align=left | Disc.: LINEAR || 
|- id="2000 UQ35" bgcolor=#fefefe
| 0 ||  || MBA-I || 16.8 || 1.3 km || multiple || 2000–2021 || 14 Jan 2021 || 96 || align=left | Disc.: LINEAR || 
|- id="2000 UE40" bgcolor=#E9E9E9
| 0 ||  || MBA-M || 16.99 || 2.2 km || multiple || 2000–2021 || 08 May 2021 || 151 || align=left | Disc.: LINEARAlt.: 2009 RE1 || 
|- id="2000 UY40" bgcolor=#fefefe
| 2 ||  || MBA-I || 17.2 || 1.1 km || multiple || 2000–2021 || 10 Jan 2021 || 44 || align=left | Disc.: LINEARAlt.: 2008 RF177 || 
|- id="2000 UV50" bgcolor=#E9E9E9
| 0 ||  || MBA-M || 17.44 || data-sort-value="0.97" | 970 m || multiple || 2000–2022 || 05 Jan 2022 || 141 || align=left | Disc.: LINEARAlt.: 2000 VZ48, 2004 RP254 || 
|- id="2000 UG57" bgcolor=#fefefe
| 0 ||  || MBA-I || 18.1 || data-sort-value="0.71" | 710 m || multiple || 2000–2020 || 16 Jun 2020 || 110 || align=left | Disc.: LINEARAlt.: 2013 NN6 || 
|- id="2000 UD74" bgcolor=#E9E9E9
| 0 ||  || MBA-M || 17.40 || 1.4 km || multiple || 2000–2021 || 25 Oct 2021 || 130 || align=left | Disc.: LINEARAlt.: 2013 WU64, 2016 LW23 || 
|- id="2000 UZ87" bgcolor=#E9E9E9
| 0 ||  || MBA-M || 17.48 || data-sort-value="0.95" | 950 m || multiple || 2000–2022 || 10 Jan 2022 || 133 || align=left | Disc.: LINEAR || 
|- id="2000 UP88" bgcolor=#fefefe
| 0 ||  || MBA-I || 18.28 || data-sort-value="0.66" | 660 m || multiple || 2000–2021 || 09 Aug 2021 || 86 || align=left | Disc.: LINEARAlt.: 2016 EB92 || 
|- id="2000 UU108" bgcolor=#E9E9E9
| 0 ||  = (359751) || MBA-M || 17.33 || 1.5 km || multiple || 1998-2022 || 21 Nov 2022 || 323 || align=left | Disc.: LINEAR || 
|- id="2000 UZ111" bgcolor=#E9E9E9
| 0 ||  || MBA-M || 17.78 || 1.2 km || multiple || 2000–2021 || 20 Nov 2021 || 159 || align=left | Disc.: SpacewatchAlt.: 2004 RO334 || 
|- id="2000 UB114" bgcolor=#fefefe
| 0 ||  || MBA-I || 18.3 || data-sort-value="0.65" | 650 m || multiple || 2000–2021 || 11 Jan 2021 || 173 || align=left | Disc.: Berg. Gladbach || 
|- id="2000 UB115" bgcolor=#d6d6d6
| 0 ||  || MBA-O || 16.66 || 2.6 km || multiple || 2000–2021 || 30 Nov 2021 || 171 || align=left | Disc.: Spacewatch || 
|- id="2000 UC115" bgcolor=#E9E9E9
| 0 ||  || MBA-M || 17.3 || 1.5 km || multiple || 2000–2021 || 06 Oct 2021 || 99 || align=left | Disc.: Spacewatch || 
|- id="2000 UD115" bgcolor=#d6d6d6
| 0 ||  || MBA-O || 16.08 || 3.4 km || multiple || 2000–2021 || 04 Oct 2021 || 168 || align=left | Disc.: Spacewatch || 
|- id="2000 UF115" bgcolor=#E9E9E9
| 0 ||  || MBA-M || 17.36 || 1.4 km || multiple || 2000–2021 || 27 Nov 2021 || 145 || align=left | Disc.: SpacewatchAlt.: 2011 HU24 || 
|- id="2000 UH115" bgcolor=#fefefe
| 0 ||  || MBA-I || 18.6 || data-sort-value="0.57" | 570 m || multiple || 2000–2020 || 12 Dec 2020 || 90 || align=left | Disc.: Spacewatch || 
|- id="2000 UK115" bgcolor=#d6d6d6
| 0 ||  || MBA-O || 16.63 || 2.6 km || multiple || 2000–2021 || 05 Jul 2021 || 85 || align=left | Disc.: Spacewatch || 
|- id="2000 UL115" bgcolor=#fefefe
| 0 ||  || MBA-I || 18.4 || data-sort-value="0.62" | 620 m || multiple || 2000–2020 || 24 Jan 2020 || 58 || align=left | Disc.: Spacewatch || 
|- id="2000 UN115" bgcolor=#E9E9E9
| 0 ||  || MBA-M || 17.17 || 1.5 km || multiple || 2000–2021 || 26 Nov 2021 || 118 || align=left | Disc.: Spacewatch || 
|- id="2000 UO115" bgcolor=#fefefe
| 0 ||  || MBA-I || 19.0 || data-sort-value="0.47" | 470 m || multiple || 2000–2019 || 04 Jul 2019 || 50 || align=left | Disc.: Spacewatch || 
|- id="2000 UP115" bgcolor=#fefefe
| 0 ||  || MBA-I || 18.6 || data-sort-value="0.57" | 570 m || multiple || 2000–2020 || 24 Sep 2020 || 52 || align=left | Disc.: Spacewatch || 
|- id="2000 UQ115" bgcolor=#fefefe
| 0 ||  || MBA-I || 17.8 || data-sort-value="0.82" | 820 m || multiple || 2000–2019 || 23 Oct 2019 || 52 || align=left | Disc.: Spacewatch || 
|- id="2000 UR115" bgcolor=#fefefe
| 0 ||  || MBA-I || 18.2 || data-sort-value="0.68" | 680 m || multiple || 2000–2015 || 13 Dec 2015 || 34 || align=left | Disc.: Spacewatch || 
|- id="2000 US115" bgcolor=#E9E9E9
| 0 ||  || MBA-M || 17.97 || 1.1 km || multiple || 2000–2021 || 28 Sep 2021 || 81 || align=left | Disc.: Spacewatch || 
|- id="2000 UT115" bgcolor=#E9E9E9
| 0 ||  || MBA-M || 18.70 || data-sort-value="0.76" | 760 m || multiple || 2000–2021 || 07 Sep 2021 || 52 || align=left | Disc.: Spacewatch || 
|- id="2000 UU115" bgcolor=#fefefe
| 0 ||  || MBA-I || 18.1 || data-sort-value="0.71" | 710 m || multiple || 1996–2019 || 28 Oct 2019 || 66 || align=left | Disc.: Spacewatch || 
|- id="2000 UV115" bgcolor=#d6d6d6
| 0 ||  || MBA-O || 16.49 || 2.8 km || multiple || 2000–2021 || 03 May 2021 || 46 || align=left | Disc.: Calar Alto || 
|- id="2000 UW115" bgcolor=#d6d6d6
| 0 ||  || MBA-O || 17.2 || 2.0 km || multiple || 2000–2020 || 20 Apr 2020 || 35 || align=left | Disc.: Spacewatch || 
|- id="2000 UX115" bgcolor=#fefefe
| 0 ||  || MBA-I || 18.53 || data-sort-value="0.58" | 580 m || multiple || 2000–2021 || 14 May 2021 || 96 || align=left | Disc.: Spacewatch || 
|- id="2000 UZ115" bgcolor=#fefefe
| 0 ||  || MBA-I || 18.41 || data-sort-value="0.62" | 620 m || multiple || 2000–2021 || 08 May 2021 || 67 || align=left | Disc.: Spacewatch || 
|- id="2000 UA116" bgcolor=#E9E9E9
| 0 ||  || MBA-M || 16.95 || 1.2 km || multiple || 2000–2021 || 13 Dec 2021 || 78 || align=left | Disc.: Spacewatch || 
|- id="2000 UB116" bgcolor=#fefefe
| 0 ||  || MBA-I || 18.9 || data-sort-value="0.49" | 490 m || multiple || 2000–2019 || 01 Nov 2019 || 55 || align=left | Disc.: Spacewatch || 
|- id="2000 UC116" bgcolor=#fefefe
| 0 ||  || MBA-I || 18.60 || data-sort-value="0.57" | 570 m || multiple || 2000–2021 || 13 Jul 2021 || 60 || align=left | Disc.: Spacewatch || 
|- id="2000 UF116" bgcolor=#E9E9E9
| 0 ||  || MBA-M || 18.5 || data-sort-value="0.84" | 840 m || multiple || 2000–2019 || 25 Jan 2019 || 35 || align=left | Disc.: Astrovirtel || 
|- id="2000 UG116" bgcolor=#fefefe
| 0 ||  || MBA-I || 17.9 || data-sort-value="0.78" | 780 m || multiple || 2000–2017 || 22 Feb 2017 || 43 || align=left | Disc.: Spacewatch || 
|- id="2000 UH116" bgcolor=#d6d6d6
| 0 ||  || MBA-O || 17.16 || 2.1 km || multiple || 2000–2021 || 07 Nov 2021 || 69 || align=left | Disc.: Spacewatch || 
|- id="2000 UJ116" bgcolor=#fefefe
| 0 ||  || MBA-I || 19.38 || data-sort-value="0.40" | 400 m || multiple || 2000–2021 || 31 Aug 2021 || 48 || align=left | Disc.: Spacewatch || 
|- id="2000 UL116" bgcolor=#d6d6d6
| 1 ||  || MBA-O || 17.42 || 1.8 km || multiple || 2000–2019 || 07 Jul 2019 || 32 || align=left | Disc.: SpacewatchAdded on 21 August 2021 || 
|- id="2000 UN116" bgcolor=#d6d6d6
| 0 ||  || MBA-O || 17.01 || 2.2 km || multiple || 2000–2021 || 26 Oct 2021 || 54 || align=left | Disc.: SpacewatchAdded on 29 January 2022 || 
|}
back to top

V 

|- id="2000 VW" bgcolor=#E9E9E9
| 0 || 2000 VW || MBA-M || 17.67 || 1.2 km || multiple || 2000–2021 || 27 Nov 2021 || 112 || align=left | Disc.: Spacewatch || 
|- id="2000 VA1" bgcolor=#fefefe
| 0 ||  || MBA-I || 17.6 || data-sort-value="0.90" | 900 m || multiple || 2000–2019 || 24 Nov 2019 || 66 || align=left | Disc.: SpacewatchAlt.: 2015 OG64 || 
|- id="2000 VP2" bgcolor=#E9E9E9
| 0 ||  || MBA-M || 18.08 || data-sort-value="0.72" | 720 m || multiple || 2000–2022 || 27 Jan 2022 || 42 || align=left | Disc.: Ondřejov Obs.Alt.: 2014 ES35 || 
|- id="2000 VN4" bgcolor=#fefefe
| 0 ||  || MBA-I || 17.4 || data-sort-value="0.98" | 980 m || multiple || 2000–2021 || 16 Jan 2021 || 107 || align=left | Disc.: LINEARAlt.: 2015 TN339 || 
|- id="2000 VF19" bgcolor=#E9E9E9
| 1 ||  || MBA-M || 17.9 || data-sort-value="0.78" | 780 m || multiple || 2000–2020 || 11 Oct 2020 || 71 || align=left | Disc.: LINEARAlt.: 2004 TE169 || 
|- id="2000 VM19" bgcolor=#E9E9E9
| 0 ||  || MBA-M || 17.64 || data-sort-value="0.88" | 880 m || multiple || 2000–2022 || 04 Jan 2022 || 123 || align=left | Disc.: LINEARAlt.: 2015 HX140 || 
|- id="2000 VU38" bgcolor=#fefefe
| 0 ||  || MBA-I || 19.1 || data-sort-value="0.45" | 450 m || multiple || 2000–2020 || 25 Jan 2020 || 33 || align=left | Disc.: SpacewatchAdded on 22 July 2020 || 
|- id="2000 VE39" bgcolor=#FA8072
| 0 ||  || MCA || 19.09 || data-sort-value="0.36" | 450 m || multiple || 2000-2019 || 26 Nov 2019 || 49 || align=left | Disc.: Spacewatch Alt.: 2015 JJ34 || 
|- id="2000 VH41" bgcolor=#d6d6d6
| 0 ||  || MBA-O || 15.8 || 3.9 km || multiple || 2000–2020 || 17 Jun 2020 || 210 || align=left | Disc.: LINEARAlt.: 2010 GD || 
|- id="2000 VZ44" bgcolor=#FFC2E0
| – ||  || APO || 21.0 || data-sort-value="0.22" | 220 m || single || 4 days || 05 Nov 2000 || 12 || align=left | Disc.: LINEAR || 
|- id="2000 VK60" bgcolor=#FA8072
| 1 ||  || MCA || 18.6 || data-sort-value="0.57" | 570 m || multiple || 2000–2020 || 26 Jan 2020 || 131 || align=left | Disc.: LINEAR || 
|- id="2000 VO65" bgcolor=#E9E9E9
| 0 ||  || MBA-M || 18.08 || data-sort-value="0.72" | 720 m || multiple || 2000–2021 || 30 Nov 2021 || 86 || align=left | Disc.: SpacewatchAlt.: 2004 TO154 || 
|- id="2000 VQ65" bgcolor=#E9E9E9
| 0 ||  || MBA-M || 17.55 || 1.3 km || multiple || 2000–2021 || 03 Oct 2021 || 150 || align=left | Disc.: Spacewatch || 
|- id="2000 VR65" bgcolor=#d6d6d6
| 0 ||  || MBA-O || 17.02 || 2.2 km || multiple || 2000–2021 || 05 Nov 2021 || 128 || align=left | Disc.: Spacewatch || 
|- id="2000 VS65" bgcolor=#E9E9E9
| 0 ||  || MBA-M || 17.0 || 2.2 km || multiple || 2000–2021 || 14 Apr 2021 || 96 || align=left | Disc.: AstrovirtelAlt.: 2014 UX225 || 
|- id="2000 VT65" bgcolor=#fefefe
| 0 ||  || MBA-I || 18.71 || data-sort-value="0.54" | 540 m || multiple || 2000–2021 || 09 Aug 2021 || 86 || align=left | Disc.: Spacewatch || 
|- id="2000 VU65" bgcolor=#fefefe
| 0 ||  = (619220) || MBA-I || 18.2 || data-sort-value="0.68" | 680 m || multiple || 2000–2020 || 22 Mar 2020 || 116 || align=left | Disc.: Spacewatch || 
|- id="2000 VW65" bgcolor=#E9E9E9
| 0 ||  || MBA-M || 18.04 || 1.0 km || multiple || 2000–2021 || 03 Oct 2021 || 64 || align=left | Disc.: Spacewatch || 
|- id="2000 VX65" bgcolor=#d6d6d6
| 0 ||  || MBA-O || 16.8 || 2.4 km || multiple || 2000–2020 || 27 Apr 2020 || 52 || align=left | Disc.: Spacewatch || 
|- id="2000 VY65" bgcolor=#fefefe
| 0 ||  || MBA-I || 18.2 || data-sort-value="0.68" | 680 m || multiple || 2000–2020 || 29 Jul 2020 || 84 || align=left | Disc.: Spacewatch || 
|- id="2000 VZ65" bgcolor=#fefefe
| 0 ||  || MBA-I || 19.1 || data-sort-value="0.45" | 450 m || multiple || 2000–2017 || 24 Oct 2017 || 36 || align=left | Disc.: Spacewatch || 
|- id="2000 VA66" bgcolor=#E9E9E9
| 0 ||  || MBA-M || 18.24 || data-sort-value="0.95" | 950 m || multiple || 2000–2021 || 11 Oct 2021 || 86 || align=left | Disc.: Spacewatch || 
|- id="2000 VB66" bgcolor=#E9E9E9
| 2 ||  || MBA-M || 18.4 || data-sort-value="0.88" | 880 m || multiple || 2000–2013 || 03 Dec 2013 || 20 || align=left | Disc.: Spacewatch || 
|- id="2000 VC66" bgcolor=#fefefe
| 0 ||  || MBA-I || 18.3 || data-sort-value="0.65" | 650 m || multiple || 2000–2019 || 27 Oct 2019 || 54 || align=left | Disc.: Spacewatch || 
|- id="2000 VD66" bgcolor=#fefefe
| 0 ||  || MBA-I || 18.92 || data-sort-value="0.49" | 490 m || multiple || 2000–2021 || 01 Nov 2021 || 73 || align=left | Disc.: Spacewatch || 
|- id="2000 VE66" bgcolor=#E9E9E9
| 0 ||  || MBA-M || 17.89 || 1.1 km || multiple || 2000–2021 || 27 Oct 2021 || 84 || align=left | Disc.: Spacewatch || 
|- id="2000 VF66" bgcolor=#E9E9E9
| 0 ||  || MBA-M || 17.94 || 1.1 km || multiple || 2000–2021 || 29 Oct 2021 || 74 || align=left | Disc.: Spacewatch || 
|- id="2000 VH66" bgcolor=#E9E9E9
| 0 ||  || MBA-M || 17.95 || 1.1 km || multiple || 2000–2021 || 29 Oct 2021 || 55 || align=left | Disc.: Spacewatch || 
|- id="2000 VJ66" bgcolor=#fefefe
| 1 ||  || MBA-I || 18.4 || data-sort-value="0.62" | 620 m || multiple || 2000–2019 || 02 Oct 2019 || 33 || align=left | Disc.: Spacewatch || 
|- id="2000 VK66" bgcolor=#E9E9E9
| 0 ||  || MBA-M || 17.86 || 1.1 km || multiple || 2000–2021 || 07 Nov 2021 || 67 || align=left | Disc.: Spacewatch || 
|- id="2000 VL66" bgcolor=#fefefe
| 0 ||  || MBA-I || 18.3 || data-sort-value="0.65" | 650 m || multiple || 2000–2019 || 03 Oct 2019 || 41 || align=left | Disc.: Spacewatch || 
|- id="2000 VN66" bgcolor=#fefefe
| 0 ||  || MBA-I || 18.65 || data-sort-value="0.55" | 550 m || multiple || 2000–2021 || 09 May 2021 || 50 || align=left | Disc.: Spacewatch || 
|- id="2000 VO66" bgcolor=#d6d6d6
| 0 ||  || MBA-O || 16.91 || 2.3 km || multiple || 2000–2021 || 01 Nov 2021 || 103 || align=left | Disc.: DB MissingAdded on 22 July 2020Alt.: 2010 KH58 || 
|}
back to top

W 

|- id="2000 WZ" bgcolor=#d6d6d6
| 0 || 2000 WZ || MBA-O || 16.54 || 2.7 km || multiple || 2000–2021 || 01 Sep 2021 || 88 || align=left | Disc.: SpacewatchAlt.: 2010 JY10, 2016 UF76 || 
|- id="2000 WC1" bgcolor=#FFC2E0
| 3 ||  || ATE || 22.2 || data-sort-value="0.13" | 130 m || multiple || 2000–2014 || 16 Nov 2014 || 52 || align=left | Disc.: LINEAR || 
|- id="2000 WL1" bgcolor=#FA8072
| 0 ||  || MCA || 19.20 || data-sort-value="0.61" | 610 m || multiple || 2000–2021 || 09 Dec 2021 || 169 || align=left | Disc.: Spacewatch || 
|- id="2000 WV2" bgcolor=#FA8072
| 1 ||  || MCA || 17.6 || data-sort-value="0.90" | 900 m || multiple || 2000–2018 || 14 Dec 2018 || 35 || align=left | Disc.: LINEARAdded on 19 October 2020 || 
|- id="2000 WW2" bgcolor=#FA8072
| 2 ||  || MCA || 17.73 || 1 km || multiple || 2000–2014 || 06 May 2014 || 63 || align=left | Disc.: LINEARAlt.: 2003 WV42 || 
|- id="2000 WM6" bgcolor=#FA8072
| – ||  || MCA || 19.7 || data-sort-value="0.34" | 340 m || single || 11 days || 29 Nov 2000 || 33 || align=left | Disc.: LONEOS || 
|- id="2000 WG10" bgcolor=#FFC2E0
| 7 ||  || APO || 23.4 || data-sort-value="0.074" | 74 m || single || 5 days || 23 Nov 2000 || 37 || align=left | Disc.: LINEAR || 
|- id="2000 WH10" bgcolor=#FFC2E0
| – ||  || APO || 22.5 || data-sort-value="0.11" | 110 m || single || 4 days || 23 Nov 2000 || 23 || align=left | Disc.: LINEAR || 
|- id="2000 WM10" bgcolor=#FFC2E0
| 5 ||  || AMO || 25.8 || data-sort-value="0.025" | 25 m || single || 15 days || 05 Dec 2000 || 22 || align=left | Disc.: LINEAR || 
|- id="2000 WS11" bgcolor=#fefefe
| 0 ||  || MBA-I || 18.1 || data-sort-value="0.71" | 710 m || multiple || 2000–2021 || 16 Jan 2021 || 103 || align=left | Disc.: Spacewatch || 
|- id="2000 WV12" bgcolor=#C2E0FF
| 5 ||  || TNO || 7.1 || 126 km || multiple || 2000–2002 || 12 Nov 2002 || 23 || align=left | Disc.: La Silla Obs.LoUTNOs, cubewano (cold) || 
|- id="2000 WW12" bgcolor=#C2E0FF
| 7 ||  || TNO || 7.6 || 114 km || multiple || 2000–2001 || 12 Dec 2001 || 13 || align=left | Disc.: La Silla Obs.LoUTNOs, SDO || 
|- id="2000 WX12" bgcolor=#C2E0FF
| E ||  || TNO || 7.6 || 104 km || single || 24 days || 18 Dec 2000 || 9 || align=left | Disc.: La Silla Obs.LoUTNOs, cubewano? || 
|- id="2000 WB13" bgcolor=#FA8072
| 0 ||  || MCA || 17.88 || data-sort-value="0.78" | 780 m || multiple || 2000–2022 || 27 Dec 2022 || 99 || align=left | Disc.: LINEAR || 
|- id="2000 WJ13" bgcolor=#E9E9E9
| 3 ||  || MBA-M || 16.7 || 1.4 km || multiple || 2000–2020 || 08 Aug 2020 || 37 || align=left | Disc.: LINEARAlt.: 2004 UW || 
|- id="2000 WP19" bgcolor=#FFC2E0
| 3 ||  || ATE || 22.7 || data-sort-value="0.10" | 100 m || multiple || 2000–2019 || 26 Dec 2019 || 72 || align=left | Disc.: LINEAR || 
|- id="2000 WR19" bgcolor=#FA8072
| 0 ||  || MCA || 17.61 || 1.15 km || multiple || 2000–2023 || 15 Feb 2023 || 290 || align=left | Disc.: LINEAR || 
|- id="2000 WS19" bgcolor=#E9E9E9
| 0 ||  || MBA-M || 17.86 || data-sort-value="0.80" | 800 m || multiple || 2000–2021 || 09 Dec 2021 || 102 || align=left | Disc.: SpacewatchAdded on 21 August 2021Alt.: 2020 HH84 || 
|- id="2000 WT19" bgcolor=#fefefe
| 0 ||  || MBA-I || 18.3 || data-sort-value="0.65" | 650 m || multiple || 2000–2020 || 12 Dec 2020 || 100 || align=left | Disc.: SpacewatchAlt.: 2010 TR100, 2015 EJ59, 2019 JV13 || 
|- id="2000 WU19" bgcolor=#E9E9E9
| 0 ||  || MBA-M || 18.45 || data-sort-value="0.86" | 860 m || multiple || 2000–2021 || 06 Nov 2021 || 70 || align=left | Disc.: Spacewatch || 
|- id="2000 WW19" bgcolor=#E9E9E9
| 0 ||  || MBA-M || 16.90 || 1.8 km || multiple || 2000–2022 || 06 Jan 2022 || 94 || align=left | Disc.: SpacewatchAlt.: 2015 ER60 || 
|- id="2000 WE20" bgcolor=#E9E9E9
| 0 ||  = (619221) || MBA-M || 17.3 || 1.9 km || multiple || 2000–2020 || 22 Apr 2020 || 48 || align=left | Disc.: Spacewatch || 
|- id="2000 WM20" bgcolor=#E9E9E9
| 0 ||  || MBA-M || 18.82 || data-sort-value="0.72" | 720 m || multiple || 2000–2021 || 13 Sep 2021 || 68 || align=left | Disc.: SpacewatchAlt.: 2013 YS134 || 
|- id="2000 WQ20" bgcolor=#E9E9E9
| 0 ||  || MBA-M || 18.86 || data-sort-value="0.71" | 710 m || multiple || 2000–2021 || 30 Oct 2021 || 61 || align=left | Disc.: SpacewatchAlt.: 2004 RB313 || 
|- id="2000 WU27" bgcolor=#E9E9E9
| 1 ||  || MBA-M || 18.5 || data-sort-value="0.84" | 840 m || multiple || 2000–2023 || 15 Jan 2023 || 39 || align=left | Disc.: Spacewatch || 
|- id="2000 WW27" bgcolor=#E9E9E9
| 0 ||  || MBA-M || 17.2 || 1.1 km || multiple || 1993–2021 || 15 Jan 2021 || 138 || align=left | Disc.: SpacewatchAlt.: 2008 XQ19 || 
|- id="2000 WX27" bgcolor=#fefefe
| 0 ||  || MBA-I || 18.41 || data-sort-value="0.62" | 620 m || multiple || 2000–2021 || 08 May 2021 || 132 || align=left | Disc.: Spacewatch || 
|- id="2000 WZ27" bgcolor=#fefefe
| 0 ||  || MBA-I || 18.34 || data-sort-value="0.64" | 640 m || multiple || 2000–2021 || 14 Jun 2021 || 94 || align=left | Disc.: SpacewatchAlt.: 2006 KY138 || 
|- id="2000 WB28" bgcolor=#E9E9E9
| 2 ||  || MBA-M || 18.4 || data-sort-value="0.62" | 620 m || multiple || 2000–2021 || 30 Nov 2021 || 49 || align=left | Disc.: SpacewatchAdded on 24 December 2021 || 
|- id="2000 WD28" bgcolor=#d6d6d6
| 0 ||  || MBA-O || 17.2 || 2.0 km || multiple || 2000–2019 || 06 Apr 2019 || 34 || align=left | Disc.: SpacewatchAdded on 5 November 2021 || 
|- id="2000 WP28" bgcolor=#E9E9E9
| E ||  || MBA-M || 18.7 || data-sort-value="0.54" | 540 m || single || 4 days || 27 Nov 2000 || 11 || align=left | Disc.: LONEOS || 
|- id="2000 WS28" bgcolor=#FFC2E0
| 9 ||  || APO || 23.4 || data-sort-value="0.074" | 74 m || single || 3 days || 23 Nov 2000 || 11 || align=left | Disc.: LINEAR || 
|- id="2000 WT28" bgcolor=#FFC2E0
| 6 ||  || APO || 24.5 || data-sort-value="0.045" | 45 m || single || 65 days || 24 Jan 2001 || 12 || align=left | Disc.: LINEARAMO at MPC || 
|- id="2000 WX28" bgcolor=#FFC2E0
| 5 ||  || AMO || 20.8 || data-sort-value="0.25" | 250 m || single || 121 days || 24 Mar 2001 || 33 || align=left | Disc.: AMOS || 
|- id="2000 WH29" bgcolor=#E9E9E9
| 0 ||  || MBA-M || 17.00 || 1.7 km || multiple || 2000–2021 || 28 Sep 2021 || 158 || align=left | Disc.: LINEAR || 
|- id="2000 WY29" bgcolor=#fefefe
| 0 ||  || HUN || 19.90 || data-sort-value="0.31" | 310 m || multiple || 2000–2021 || 08 Jun 2021 || 39 || align=left | Disc.: Spacewatch || 
|- id="2000 WX37" bgcolor=#FA8072
| 0 ||  || MCA || 18.61 || data-sort-value="0.56" | 560 m || multiple || 2000–2022 || 07 Jan 2022 || 240 || align=left | Disc.: LINEAR || 
|- id="2000 WU50" bgcolor=#fefefe
| 1 ||  || MBA-I || 18.8 || data-sort-value="0.52" | 520 m || multiple || 2000–2020 || 14 Dec 2020 || 87 || align=left | Disc.: Bohyunsan Obs.Alt.: 2010 XU30 || 
|- id="2000 WZ51" bgcolor=#fefefe
| 0 ||  || MBA-I || 18.58 || data-sort-value="0.57" | 570 m || multiple || 2000–2021 || 07 Oct 2021 || 50 || align=left | Disc.: SpacewatchAdded on 9 March 2021 || 
|- id="2000 WE52" bgcolor=#E9E9E9
| 0 ||  || MBA-M || 17.27 || 2.0 km || multiple || 2000–2021 || 05 Jun 2021 || 169 || align=left | Disc.: SpacewatchAlt.: 2016 ES125 || 
|- id="2000 WG52" bgcolor=#d6d6d6
| 0 ||  || MBA-O || 16.34 || 3.0 km || multiple || 2000–2021 || 26 Oct 2021 || 64 || align=left | Disc.: SpacewatchAlt.: 2011 WA81 || 
|- id="2000 WJ52" bgcolor=#fefefe
| 0 ||  || MBA-I || 18.5 || data-sort-value="0.59" | 590 m || multiple || 2000–2020 || 11 Dec 2020 || 56 || align=left | Disc.: SpacewatchAdded on 17 January 2021 || 
|- id="2000 WY52" bgcolor=#E9E9E9
| 0 ||  || MBA-M || 17.13 || 2.1 km || multiple || 1997–2021 || 01 May 2021 || 125 || align=left | Disc.: SpacewatchAlt.: 2011 BP84, 2014 WT352, 2016 DO16 || 
|- id="2000 WZ52" bgcolor=#d6d6d6
| 2 ||  || MBA-O || 17.67 || 1.6 km || multiple || 2000–2021 || 30 Oct 2021 || 51 || align=left | Disc.: Spacewatch || 
|- id="2000 WA53" bgcolor=#E9E9E9
| 0 ||  || MBA-M || 18.32 || data-sort-value="0.91" | 910 m || multiple || 2000–2021 || 08 Aug 2021 || 27 || align=left | Disc.: SpacewatchAlt.: 2013 WU75 || 
|- id="2000 WE53" bgcolor=#E9E9E9
| 0 ||  || MBA-M || 17.52 || 1.7 km || multiple || 2000–2021 || 14 May 2021 || 53 || align=left | Disc.: SpacewatchAlt.: 2014 WO137 || 
|- id="2000 WG53" bgcolor=#E9E9E9
| 0 ||  || MBA-M || 17.68 || 1.6 km || multiple || 2000–2021 || 30 Jun 2021 || 84 || align=left | Disc.: SpacewatchAlt.: 2009 UB142 || 
|- id="2000 WO53" bgcolor=#d6d6d6
| 0 ||  || MBA-O || 16.35 || 3.0 km || multiple || 1993–2021 || 10 Aug 2021 || 221 || align=left | Disc.: SpacewatchAlt.: 2010 KC32, 2011 UE48 || 
|- id="2000 WQ53" bgcolor=#d6d6d6
| 0 ||  || MBA-O || 17.61 || 1.7 km || multiple || 2000–2021 || 28 Nov 2021 || 54 || align=left | Disc.: SpacewatchAlt.: 2005 VM22 || 
|- id="2000 WS53" bgcolor=#fefefe
| 1 ||  || MBA-I || 19.30 || data-sort-value="0.41" | 410 m || multiple || 2000–2021 || 09 Nov 2021 || 65 || align=left | Disc.: SpacewatchAlt.: 2007 VO236 || 
|- id="2000 WG63" bgcolor=#FFC2E0
| 6 ||  || APO || 23.2 || data-sort-value="0.081" | 81 m || single || 16 days || 12 Dec 2000 || 47 || align=left | Disc.: LINEARAMO at MPC || 
|- id="2000 WH63" bgcolor=#FFC2E0
| 5 ||  || AMO || 21.7 || data-sort-value="0.16" | 160 m || single || 59 days || 24 Jan 2001 || 44 || align=left | Disc.: LINEAR || 
|- id="2000 WJ63" bgcolor=#FFC2E0
| 4 ||  || AMO || 20.9 || data-sort-value="0.23" | 230 m || single || 118 days || 24 Mar 2001 || 91 || align=left | Disc.: LINEAR || 
|- id="2000 WL63" bgcolor=#FFC2E0
| 0 ||  || APO || 19.8 || data-sort-value="0.39" | 390 m || multiple || 2000–2020 || 21 Jun 2020 || 279 || align=left | Disc.: LINEARAMO at MPC || 
|- id="2000 WM63" bgcolor=#FFC2E0
| 0 ||  || APO || 20.24 || data-sort-value="0.32" | 320 m || multiple || 2000–2022 || 21 Jan 2022 || 109 || align=left | Disc.: LINEAR || 
|- id="2000 WT63" bgcolor=#E9E9E9
| 0 ||  || MBA-M || 17.53 || data-sort-value="0.93" | 930 m || multiple || 2000–2022 || 25 Jan 2022 || 69 || align=left | Disc.: Spacewatch || 
|- id="2000 WC64" bgcolor=#d6d6d6
| 0 ||  || MBA-O || 16.61 || 2.7 km || multiple || 2000–2021 || 31 Aug 2021 || 79 || align=left | Disc.: Spacewatch || 
|- id="2000 WD65" bgcolor=#fefefe
| 3 ||  || MBA-I || 19.0 || data-sort-value="0.47" | 470 m || multiple || 2000–2018 || 12 Nov 2018 || 42 || align=left | Disc.: Spacewatch || 
|- id="2000 WN67" bgcolor=#E9E9E9
| 0 ||  || MBA-M || 17.43 || 1 km || multiple || 2000-2022 || 21 Apr 2022 || 86 || align=left | Disc.: LINEAR Alt.: 2016 PA33 || 
|- id="2000 WC79" bgcolor=#d6d6d6
| 0 ||  || MBA-O || 15.3 || 4.8 km || multiple || 2000–2021 || 29 Sep 2021 || 220 || align=left | Disc.: LINEARAlt.: 2010 HY95 || 
|- id="2000 WD79" bgcolor=#E9E9E9
| 0 ||  || MBA-M || 18.27 || data-sort-value="0.66" | 660 m || multiple || 2000–2022 || 05 Jan 2022 || 51 || align=left | Disc.: LINEAR || 
|- id="2000 WB105" bgcolor=#fefefe
| 1 ||  || MBA-I || 18.7 || data-sort-value="0.54" | 540 m || multiple || 2000–2018 || 12 Jan 2018 || 61 || align=left | Disc.: Spacewatch || 
|- id="2000 WE105" bgcolor=#E9E9E9
| 1 ||  || MBA-M || 18.76 || data-sort-value="0.76" | 750 m || multiple || 2000–2022 || 26 Nov 2022 || 21 || align=left | Disc.: Spacewatch || 
|- id="2000 WY105" bgcolor=#fefefe
| 0 ||  || MBA-I || 18.4 || data-sort-value="0.62" | 620 m || multiple || 2000–2020 || 22 Jan 2020 || 108 || align=left | Disc.: SpacewatchAlt.: 2011 QM39, 2015 VO18 || 
|- id="2000 WJ107" bgcolor=#FFC2E0
| 5 ||  || APO || 23.8 || data-sort-value="0.062" | 62 m || single || 24 days || 20 Dec 2000 || 33 || align=left | Disc.: LINEAR || 
|- id="2000 WL107" bgcolor=#FFC2E0
| 5 ||  || APO || 24.8 || data-sort-value="0.039" | 39 m || single || 21 days || 20 Dec 2000 || 155 || align=left | Disc.: LINEARAMO at MPC || 
|- id="2000 WM107" bgcolor=#FFC2E0
| 0 ||  || APO || 18.7 || data-sort-value="0.65" | 650 m || multiple || 2000–2021 || 08 Jan 2021 || 131 || align=left | Disc.: LINEAR || 
|- id="2000 WS112" bgcolor=#d6d6d6
| 0 ||  || MBA-O || 16.61 || 2.7 km || multiple || 2000–2021 || 09 Apr 2021 || 159 || align=left | Disc.: LINEARAlt.: 2005 XR18, 2016 AZ157 || 
|- id="2000 WC127" bgcolor=#E9E9E9
| 1 ||  || MBA-M || 17.8 || data-sort-value="0.82" | 820 m || multiple || 2000–2020 || 13 Sep 2020 || 68 || align=left | Disc.: Spacewatch || 
|- id="2000 WE128" bgcolor=#fefefe
| 0 ||  || MBA-I || 17.03 || 1.2 km || multiple || 2000–2021 || 18 May 2021 || 224 || align=left | Disc.: SpacewatchAlt.: 2015 YZ3, 2015 YZ4, 2018 LL16 || 
|- id="2000 WN129" bgcolor=#E9E9E9
| 0 ||  || MBA-M || 17.4 || 1.4 km || multiple || 2000–2021 || 14 Jun 2021 || 53 || align=left | Disc.: Spacewatch || 
|- id="2000 WM131" bgcolor=#E9E9E9
| 0 ||  || MBA-M || 18.02 || data-sort-value="0.74" | 740 m || multiple || 2000–2022 || 07 Jan 2022 || 69 || align=left | Disc.: SpacewatchAlt.: 2004 TC71 || 
|- id="2000 WC132" bgcolor=#E9E9E9
| 0 ||  || MBA-M || 18.23 || data-sort-value="0.67" | 670 m || multiple || 2000–2022 || 25 Jan 2022 || 65 || align=left | Disc.: SpacewatchAlt.: 2004 TJ240 || 
|- id="2000 WO139" bgcolor=#E9E9E9
| 0 ||  || MBA-M || 17.72 || 1.2 km || multiple || 2000–2021 || 03 Dec 2021 || 72 || align=left | Disc.: LINEAR || 
|- id="2000 WM147" bgcolor=#fefefe
| 2 ||  || MBA-I || 18.96 || data-sort-value="0.48" | 480 m || multiple || 2000–2020 || 14 Dec 2020 || 30 || align=left | Disc.: SpacewatchAdded on 11 May 2021 || 
|- id="2000 WQ147" bgcolor=#E9E9E9
| 1 ||  || MBA-M || 17.7 || 1.6 km || multiple || 2000–2018 || 15 Dec 2018 || 31 || align=left | Disc.: SpacewatchAdded on 22 July 2020Alt.: 2018 XY11 || 
|- id="2000 WF148" bgcolor=#d6d6d6
| 0 ||  || MBA-O || 17.0 || 2.2 km || multiple || 1997–2019 || 26 May 2019 || 44 || align=left | Disc.: Spacewatch || 
|- id="2000 WN148" bgcolor=#FFC2E0
| 5 ||  || AMO || 22.4 || data-sort-value="0.12" | 120 m || single || 22 days || 21 Dec 2000 || 18 || align=left | Disc.: LINEAR || 
|- id="2000 WO148" bgcolor=#FFC2E0
| 0 ||  || AMO || 20.53 || data-sort-value="0.28" | 280 m || multiple || 2000–2021 || 26 Nov 2021 || 166 || align=left | Disc.: LONEOS || 
|- id="2000 WQ148" bgcolor=#FFC2E0
| 7 ||  || APO || 22.7 || data-sort-value="0.10" | 100 m || single || 12 days || 12 Dec 2000 || 48 || align=left | Disc.: LINEAR || 
|- id="2000 WG150" bgcolor=#fefefe
| 0 ||  || MBA-I || 17.4 || data-sort-value="0.98" | 980 m || multiple || 2000–2021 || 10 Apr 2021 || 175 || align=left | Disc.: SpacewatchAlt.: 2015 VV46 || 
|- id="2000 WP156" bgcolor=#E9E9E9
| 0 ||  || MBA-M || 17.05 || 2.2 km || multiple || 2000–2021 || 15 Mar 2021 || 57 || align=left | Disc.: LINEAR || 
|- id="2000 WR165" bgcolor=#E9E9E9
| 0 ||  || MBA-M || 17.72 || 1.2 km || multiple || 2000–2021 || 24 Nov 2021 || 65 || align=left | Disc.: Kitt PeakAdded on 5 November 2021 || 
|- id="2000 WT169" bgcolor=#C2E0FF
| 2 ||  || TNO || 6.1 || 155 km || multiple || 2000–2020 || 18 Jan 2020 || 71 || align=left | Disc.: Mauna Kea Obs.LoUTNOs, cubewano (cold), binary: 127 km || 
|- id="2000 WW169" bgcolor=#E9E9E9
| 0 ||  || MBA-M || 17.23 || 1.1 km || multiple || 2000–2022 || 23 Jan 2022 || 99 || align=left | Disc.: AMOS || 
|- id="2000 WB170" bgcolor=#E9E9E9
| 1 ||  || MBA-M || 17.99 || 1.1 km || multiple || 2000–2021 || 03 Dec 2021 || 49 || align=left | Disc.: Spacewatch || 
|- id="2000 WX177" bgcolor=#fefefe
| 0 ||  || MBA-I || 17.9 || data-sort-value="0.78" | 780 m || multiple || 2000–2020 || 06 Oct 2020 || 43 || align=left | Disc.: SpacewatchAdded on 11 May 2021 || 
|- id="2000 WL183" bgcolor=#C2E0FF
| 3 ||  || TNO || 7.6 || 100 km || multiple || 2000–2020 || 14 Nov 2020 || 20 || align=left | Disc.: La Silla Obs.LoUTNOs, cubewano (cold) || 
|- id="2000 WM183" bgcolor=#C2E0FF
| 4 ||  || TNO || 7.19 || 188 km || multiple || 2000–2022 || 26 Dec 2022 || 24 || align=left | Disc.: La Silla Obs.LoUTNOs, cubewano (hot) || 
|- id="2000 WN183" bgcolor=#C2E0FF
| 5 ||  || TNO || 7.0 || 132 km || multiple || 2000–2006 || 20 Oct 2006 || 16 || align=left | Disc.: La Silla Obs.LoUTNOs, cubewano (cold) || 
|- id="2000 WO183" bgcolor=#C2E0FF
| 4 ||  || TNO || 7.46 || 107 km || multiple || 2000–2021 || 01 Dec 2021 || 26 || align=left | Disc.: La Silla Obs.LoUTNOs, cubewano (cold) || 
|- id="2000 WA187" bgcolor=#d6d6d6
| – ||  || HIL || 17.7 || 1.6 km || single || 24 days || 17 Dec 2000 || 10 || align=left | Disc.: Mauna Kea Obs. || 
|- id="2000 WB187" bgcolor=#d6d6d6
| 1 ||  || HIL || 16.80 || 2.4 km || multiple || 2000–2021 || 04 Sep 2021 || 59 || align=left | Disc.: Mauna Kea Obs.Alt.: 2007 VW200 || 
|- id="2000 WP193" bgcolor=#fefefe
| 0 ||  || MBA-I || 18.2 || data-sort-value="0.68" | 680 m || multiple || 2000–2019 || 31 Oct 2019 || 47 || align=left | Disc.: Kitt Peak || 
|- id="2000 WQ193" bgcolor=#d6d6d6
| D ||  || MBA-O || 17.4 || 1.8 km || single || 27 days || 21 Dec 2000 || 28 || align=left | Disc.: Kitt PeakAlt.: 2000 YO141 || 
|- id="2000 WV193" bgcolor=#FA8072
| – ||  || MCA || 19.0 || data-sort-value="0.47" | 470 m || single || 1 day || 25 Nov 2000 || 16 || align=left | Disc.: Kitt Peak || 
|- id="2000 WD194" bgcolor=#E9E9E9
| 1 ||  || MBA-M || 17.6 || 1.3 km || multiple || 2000–2020 || 08 Oct 2020 || 65 || align=left | Disc.: Kitt PeakAlt.: 2010 EW81 || 
|- id="2000 WE194" bgcolor=#C2FFFF
| – ||  || JT || 15.6 || 4.2 km || single || 2 days || 26 Nov 2000 || 25 || align=left | Disc.: Kitt PeakGreek camp (L4) || 
|- id="2000 WF194" bgcolor=#d6d6d6
| 0 ||  || MBA-O || 17.5 || 1.7 km || multiple || 2000-2022 || 07 Apr 2022 || 49 || align=left | Disc.: Kitt Peak || 
|- id="2000 WK194" bgcolor=#E9E9E9
| 0 ||  || MBA-M || 17.41 || 1.4 km || multiple || 2000–2022 || 06 Jan 2022 || 141 || align=left | Disc.: Kitt PeakAlt.: 2010 AW91 || 
|- id="2000 WM194" bgcolor=#E9E9E9
| 0 ||  || MBA-M || 16.71 || 2.5 km || multiple || 2000–2021 || 09 Jul 2021 || 146 || align=left | Disc.: Kitt Peak || 
|- id="2000 WN194" bgcolor=#d6d6d6
| 0 ||  || MBA-O || 17.45 || 1.8 km || multiple || 2000–2021 || 07 Nov 2021 || 44 || align=left | Disc.: Kitt PeakAdded on 5 November 2021Alt.: 2021 QY48 || 
|- id="2000 WP194" bgcolor=#fefefe
| 0 ||  || MBA-I || 19.3 || data-sort-value="0.41" | 410 m || multiple || 2000–2021 || 04 Jan 2021 || 66 || align=left | Disc.: Whipple Obs.Added on 21 August 2021Alt.: 2013 RN1 || 
|- id="2000 WP195" bgcolor=#d6d6d6
| 1 ||  || MBA-O || 17.5 || 1.8 km || multiple || 2000–2016 || 21 Oct 2016 || 32 || align=left | Disc.: SpacewatchAlt.: 2011 WP123 || 
|- id="2000 WE196" bgcolor=#E9E9E9
| 0 ||  || MBA-M || 16.7 || 2.5 km || multiple || 2000–2021 || 15 May 2021 || 133 || align=left | Disc.: Spacewatch || 
|- id="2000 WF198" bgcolor=#E9E9E9
| 0 ||  || MBA-M || 17.05 || 2.2 km || multiple || 2000–2021 || 13 May 2021 || 88 || align=left | Disc.: Mauna Kea Obs.Alt.: 2009 SK99 || 
|- id="2000 WM198" bgcolor=#E9E9E9
| 0 ||  || MBA-M || 18.34 || data-sort-value="0.90" | 900 m || multiple || 2000–2021 || 06 Jul 2021 || 30 || align=left | Disc.: SpacewatchAdded on 11 May 2021Alt.: 2017 UK85 || 
|- id="2000 WN198" bgcolor=#d6d6d6
| 1 ||  || MBA-O || 16.9 || 2.3 km || multiple || 2000–2020 || 22 Apr 2020 || 20 || align=left | Disc.: SDSSAdded on 22 July 2020 || 
|- id="2000 WO198" bgcolor=#d6d6d6
| 0 ||  || HIL || 16.3 || 3.1 km || multiple || 2000–2018 || 12 Feb 2018 || 28 || align=left | Disc.: Spacewatch || 
|- id="2000 WP198" bgcolor=#d6d6d6
| 0 ||  || HIL || 16.1 || 3.4 km || multiple || 2000–2019 || 03 Apr 2019 || 46 || align=left | Disc.: Spacewatch || 
|- id="2000 WT198" bgcolor=#E9E9E9
| 0 ||  || MBA-M || 17.20 || 1.5 km || multiple || 2000–2021 || 01 Nov 2021 || 146 || align=left | Disc.: Spacewatch || 
|- id="2000 WU198" bgcolor=#d6d6d6
| 0 ||  || MBA-O || 15.4 || 4.6 km || multiple || 2000–2020 || 20 May 2020 || 150 || align=left | Disc.: SDSS || 
|- id="2000 WV198" bgcolor=#fefefe
| 0 ||  || MBA-I || 17.89 || data-sort-value="0.79" | 790 m || multiple || 2000–2022 || 27 Jan 2022 || 166 || align=left | Disc.: Spacewatch || 
|- id="2000 WW198" bgcolor=#d6d6d6
| 0 ||  || MBA-O || 16.4 || 2.9 km || multiple || 2000–2020 || 16 May 2020 || 106 || align=left | Disc.: SDSS || 
|- id="2000 WX198" bgcolor=#d6d6d6
| 0 ||  || MBA-O || 16.5 || 2.8 km || multiple || 2000–2020 || 29 Apr 2020 || 89 || align=left | Disc.: SDSS || 
|- id="2000 WZ198" bgcolor=#d6d6d6
| 0 ||  || MBA-O || 16.31 || 3.0 km || multiple || 2000–2022 || 10 Jan 2022 || 155 || align=left | Disc.: SpacewatchAlt.: 2010 OW3 || 
|- id="2000 WB199" bgcolor=#E9E9E9
| 0 ||  || MBA-M || 16.84 || 1.8 km || multiple || 2000–2021 || 27 Nov 2021 || 148 || align=left | Disc.: SpacewatchAlt.: 2010 JX105 || 
|- id="2000 WE199" bgcolor=#fefefe
| 0 ||  || MBA-I || 17.9 || data-sort-value="0.78" | 780 m || multiple || 2000–2020 || 16 Oct 2020 || 100 || align=left | Disc.: Spacewatch || 
|- id="2000 WF199" bgcolor=#E9E9E9
| 0 ||  || MBA-M || 17.5 || data-sort-value="0.94" | 940 m || multiple || 2000–2020 || 06 Dec 2020 || 91 || align=left | Disc.: Spacewatch || 
|- id="2000 WG199" bgcolor=#d6d6d6
| 0 ||  || MBA-O || 16.31 || 3.0 km || multiple || 2000–2021 || 25 Nov 2021 || 118 || align=left | Disc.: SDSS || 
|- id="2000 WH199" bgcolor=#fefefe
| 0 ||  || MBA-I || 17.6 || data-sort-value="0.90" | 900 m || multiple || 2000–2020 || 15 Feb 2020 || 110 || align=left | Disc.: Spacewatch || 
|- id="2000 WK199" bgcolor=#E9E9E9
| 0 ||  || MBA-M || 17.07 || 1.6 km || multiple || 2000–2022 || 07 Jan 2022 || 197 || align=left | Disc.: SpacewatchAlt.: 2004 TK18 || 
|- id="2000 WL199" bgcolor=#fefefe
| 0 ||  || MBA-I || 17.50 || data-sort-value="0.94" | 940 m || multiple || 2004–2021 || 14 Apr 2021 || 116 || align=left | Disc.: Spacewatch || 
|- id="2000 WM199" bgcolor=#fefefe
| 0 ||  || MBA-I || 18.0 || data-sort-value="0.75" | 750 m || multiple || 2000–2018 || 12 Jul 2018 || 70 || align=left | Disc.: Spacewatch || 
|- id="2000 WN199" bgcolor=#E9E9E9
| 0 ||  || MBA-M || 16.9 || 1.2 km || multiple || 2000–2020 || 14 Nov 2020 || 110 || align=left | Disc.: SDSS || 
|- id="2000 WP199" bgcolor=#d6d6d6
| 0 ||  || MBA-O || 16.6 || 2.7 km || multiple || 2000–2020 || 13 May 2020 || 63 || align=left | Disc.: SDSS || 
|- id="2000 WQ199" bgcolor=#fefefe
| 0 ||  || MBA-I || 18.21 || data-sort-value="0.68" | 680 m || multiple || 2000–2021 || 11 Jun 2021 || 122 || align=left | Disc.: SDSS || 
|- id="2000 WR199" bgcolor=#E9E9E9
| 1 ||  || MBA-M || 17.0 || 1.2 km || multiple || 2000–2020 || 11 Oct 2020 || 149 || align=left | Disc.: SDSS || 
|- id="2000 WX199" bgcolor=#E9E9E9
| 0 ||  || MBA-M || 17.23 || 1.5 km || multiple || 1991–2021 || 30 Nov 2021 || 177 || align=left | Disc.: SpacewatchAlt.: 2004 TA287 || 
|- id="2000 WY199" bgcolor=#d6d6d6
| 0 ||  || MBA-O || 16.6 || 2.7 km || multiple || 2000–2020 || 22 Apr 2020 || 66 || align=left | Disc.: Spacewatch || 
|- id="2000 WA200" bgcolor=#d6d6d6
| 0 ||  || MBA-O || 16.6 || 2.7 km || multiple || 2000–2019 || 11 Feb 2019 || 54 || align=left | Disc.: SDSS || 
|- id="2000 WC200" bgcolor=#d6d6d6
| 0 ||  || MBA-O || 16.8 || 2.4 km || multiple || 2000–2020 || 21 Apr 2020 || 65 || align=left | Disc.: SDSS || 
|- id="2000 WD200" bgcolor=#E9E9E9
| 0 ||  || MBA-M || 16.9 || 1.8 km || multiple || 2000–2020 || 22 Mar 2020 || 62 || align=left | Disc.: Spacewatch || 
|- id="2000 WG200" bgcolor=#E9E9E9
| 1 ||  || MBA-M || 17.6 || 1.3 km || multiple || 2000–2019 || 12 Jan 2019 || 52 || align=left | Disc.: Spacewatch || 
|- id="2000 WJ200" bgcolor=#E9E9E9
| 0 ||  || MBA-M || 17.15 || 2.1 km || multiple || 2000–2021 || 30 May 2021 || 83 || align=left | Disc.: SDSS || 
|- id="2000 WK200" bgcolor=#d6d6d6
| 0 ||  || MBA-O || 16.65 || 2.6 km || multiple || 2000–2021 || 02 Dec 2021 || 127 || align=left | Disc.: Spacewatch || 
|- id="2000 WL200" bgcolor=#d6d6d6
| 1 ||  || MBA-O || 16.7 || 2.5 km || multiple || 2000–2019 || 08 Feb 2019 || 55 || align=left | Disc.: Spacewatch || 
|- id="2000 WM200" bgcolor=#fefefe
| 0 ||  || MBA-I || 18.02 || data-sort-value="0.74" | 740 m || multiple || 2000–2021 || 17 Apr 2021 || 105 || align=left | Disc.: Spacewatch || 
|- id="2000 WO200" bgcolor=#d6d6d6
| 1 ||  || MBA-O || 16.5 || 2.8 km || multiple || 2000–2018 || 23 Jan 2018 || 60 || align=left | Disc.: SDSS || 
|- id="2000 WP200" bgcolor=#d6d6d6
| 0 ||  || MBA-O || 16.7 || 2.5 km || multiple || 2000–2020 || 20 Apr 2020 || 48 || align=left | Disc.: Spacewatch || 
|- id="2000 WQ200" bgcolor=#fefefe
| 0 ||  || MBA-I || 18.4 || data-sort-value="0.62" | 620 m || multiple || 2000–2021 || 07 Jan 2021 || 61 || align=left | Disc.: Spacewatch || 
|- id="2000 WR200" bgcolor=#E9E9E9
| 0 ||  || MBA-M || 17.50 || 1.8 km || multiple || 2000–2021 || 16 Apr 2021 || 72 || align=left | Disc.: Spacewatch || 
|- id="2000 WS200" bgcolor=#E9E9E9
| 0 ||  || MBA-M || 17.3 || 1.0 km || multiple || 2000–2021 || 08 Jan 2021 || 97 || align=left | Disc.: SDSS || 
|- id="2000 WU200" bgcolor=#E9E9E9
| 0 ||  || MBA-M || 17.65 || 1.2 km || multiple || 2000–2021 || 01 Nov 2021 || 166 || align=left | Disc.: Spacewatch || 
|- id="2000 WW200" bgcolor=#fefefe
| 0 ||  || MBA-I || 17.5 || data-sort-value="0.94" | 940 m || multiple || 2000–2019 || 20 Dec 2019 || 120 || align=left | Disc.: Spacewatch || 
|- id="2000 WX200" bgcolor=#fefefe
| 0 ||  || MBA-I || 18.7 || data-sort-value="0.54" | 540 m || multiple || 2000–2020 || 23 Mar 2020 || 52 || align=left | Disc.: Spacewatch || 
|- id="2000 WY200" bgcolor=#fefefe
| 0 ||  || MBA-I || 18.28 || data-sort-value="0.66" | 660 m || multiple || 2000–2021 || 24 Sep 2021 || 86 || align=left | Disc.: Spacewatch || 
|- id="2000 WZ200" bgcolor=#d6d6d6
| 0 ||  || MBA-O || 16.9 || 2.3 km || multiple || 2000–2019 || 24 Oct 2019 || 60 || align=left | Disc.: SDSS || 
|- id="2000 WC201" bgcolor=#d6d6d6
| 0 ||  || MBA-O || 16.5 || 2.8 km || multiple || 2000–2021 || 14 Jun 2021 || 52 || align=left | Disc.: SDSS || 
|- id="2000 WD201" bgcolor=#fefefe
| 0 ||  || MBA-I || 18.34 || data-sort-value="0.64" | 640 m || multiple || 2000–2022 || 05 Jan 2022 || 58 || align=left | Disc.: Spacewatch || 
|- id="2000 WE201" bgcolor=#d6d6d6
| 0 ||  || MBA-O || 16.9 || 2.3 km || multiple || 2000–2020 || 21 Jun 2020 || 50 || align=left | Disc.: SDSS || 
|- id="2000 WF201" bgcolor=#fefefe
| 0 ||  || MBA-I || 17.75 || data-sort-value="0.84" | 840 m || multiple || 2000–2021 || 06 May 2021 || 111 || align=left | Disc.: Spacewatch || 
|- id="2000 WG201" bgcolor=#E9E9E9
| 0 ||  || MBA-M || 17.68 || 1.6 km || multiple || 2000–2021 || 30 May 2021 || 64 || align=left | Disc.: Spacewatch || 
|- id="2000 WJ201" bgcolor=#d6d6d6
| 0 ||  || MBA-O || 17.16 || 2.1 km || multiple || 2000–2021 || 27 Oct 2021 || 107 || align=left | Disc.: Spacewatch || 
|- id="2000 WK201" bgcolor=#d6d6d6
| 0 ||  || MBA-O || 17.0 || 2.2 km || multiple || 2000–2019 || 08 Feb 2019 || 43 || align=left | Disc.: SDSS || 
|- id="2000 WL201" bgcolor=#d6d6d6
| 0 ||  || MBA-O || 16.80 || 2.4 km || multiple || 2000–2021 || 26 Nov 2021 || 98 || align=left | Disc.: Spacewatch || 
|- id="2000 WM201" bgcolor=#d6d6d6
| 0 ||  || MBA-O || 16.2 || 3.2 km || multiple || 2000–2021 || 18 Jan 2021 || 110 || align=left | Disc.: SDSS || 
|- id="2000 WN201" bgcolor=#d6d6d6
| 0 ||  || MBA-O || 16.74 || 2.5 km || multiple || 2000–2021 || 31 May 2021 || 41 || align=left | Disc.: SDSS || 
|- id="2000 WO201" bgcolor=#E9E9E9
| 0 ||  || MBA-M || 17.74 || 1.2 km || multiple || 2000–2021 || 31 Oct 2021 || 120 || align=left | Disc.: Spacewatch || 
|- id="2000 WQ201" bgcolor=#fefefe
| 0 ||  || MBA-I || 18.8 || data-sort-value="0.52" | 520 m || multiple || 2000–2020 || 22 Apr 2020 || 53 || align=left | Disc.: Spacewatch || 
|- id="2000 WR201" bgcolor=#E9E9E9
| 0 ||  || MBA-M || 16.82 || 1.8 km || multiple || 2000–2022 || 11 Jan 2022 || 125 || align=left | Disc.: SDSS || 
|- id="2000 WT201" bgcolor=#d6d6d6
| 0 ||  || MBA-O || 16.58 || 2.7 km || multiple || 2000–2021 || 07 Aug 2021 || 45 || align=left | Disc.: SDSS || 
|- id="2000 WU201" bgcolor=#fefefe
| 0 ||  || MBA-I || 19.1 || data-sort-value="0.45" | 450 m || multiple || 2000–2017 || 28 Sep 2017 || 37 || align=left | Disc.: Kitt Peak || 
|- id="2000 WW201" bgcolor=#E9E9E9
| 0 ||  || MBA-M || 17.3 || 1.5 km || multiple || 2000–2015 || 22 Jan 2015 || 38 || align=left | Disc.: SDSS || 
|- id="2000 WX201" bgcolor=#fefefe
| 2 ||  || MBA-I || 19.0 || data-sort-value="0.47" | 470 m || multiple || 2000–2017 || 24 Nov 2017 || 35 || align=left | Disc.: Spacewatch || 
|- id="2000 WY201" bgcolor=#d6d6d6
| 1 ||  || MBA-O || 17.4 || 1.8 km || multiple || 2000–2017 || 26 Oct 2017 || 28 || align=left | Disc.: SDSS || 
|- id="2000 WZ201" bgcolor=#E9E9E9
| 0 ||  = (619222) || MBA-M || 17.3 || 1.5 km || multiple || 2000–2020 || 24 May 2020 || 75 || align=left | Disc.: Spacewatch || 
|- id="2000 WA202" bgcolor=#E9E9E9
| 0 ||  || MBA-M || 17.71 || 1.2 km || multiple || 2000–2021 || 05 Oct 2021 || 44 || align=left | Disc.: SDSS || 
|- id="2000 WC202" bgcolor=#d6d6d6
| 0 ||  || MBA-O || 17.20 || 2.0 km || multiple || 2000–2021 || 01 Jul 2021 || 33 || align=left | Disc.: Spacewatch || 
|- id="2000 WD202" bgcolor=#d6d6d6
| 0 ||  || MBA-O || 17.0 || 2.2 km || multiple || 2000–2020 || 22 Apr 2020 || 34 || align=left | Disc.: Spacewatch || 
|- id="2000 WE202" bgcolor=#E9E9E9
| 1 ||  || MBA-M || 18.7 || data-sort-value="0.76" | 760 m || multiple || 2000–2017 || 25 Jul 2017 || 27 || align=left | Disc.: Spacewatch || 
|- id="2000 WF202" bgcolor=#fefefe
| 2 ||  || MBA-I || 18.96 || data-sort-value="0.48" | 480 m || multiple || 2000–2022 || 06 Jan 2022 || 41 || align=left | Disc.: Spacewatch || 
|- id="2000 WG202" bgcolor=#d6d6d6
| 1 ||  || MBA-O || 17.87 || 1.5 km || multiple || 2000–2021 || 11 Oct 2021 || 51 || align=left | Disc.: Spacewatch || 
|- id="2000 WH202" bgcolor=#d6d6d6
| 0 ||  || MBA-O || 17.06 || 2.2 km || multiple || 2000–2021 || 05 Jul 2021 || 30 || align=left | Disc.: SDSS || 
|- id="2000 WL202" bgcolor=#fefefe
| 0 ||  || MBA-I || 18.1 || data-sort-value="0.71" | 710 m || multiple || 2000–2021 || 16 Jan 2021 || 105 || align=left | Disc.: Spacewatch || 
|- id="2000 WM202" bgcolor=#d6d6d6
| 0 ||  || MBA-O || 17.0 || 2.2 km || multiple || 2000–2021 || 04 Jan 2021 || 94 || align=left | Disc.: Spacewatch || 
|- id="2000 WN202" bgcolor=#fefefe
| 0 ||  || MBA-I || 18.2 || data-sort-value="0.68" | 680 m || multiple || 2000–2020 || 22 Jan 2020 || 89 || align=left | Disc.: Spacewatch || 
|- id="2000 WO202" bgcolor=#d6d6d6
| 0 ||  || MBA-O || 16.9 || 2.3 km || multiple || 2000–2021 || 17 Jan 2021 || 93 || align=left | Disc.: Spacewatch || 
|- id="2000 WQ202" bgcolor=#E9E9E9
| 0 ||  || MBA-M || 17.16 || 2.1 km || multiple || 2000–2021 || 01 May 2021 || 99 || align=left | Disc.: Spacewatch || 
|- id="2000 WR202" bgcolor=#d6d6d6
| 0 ||  || MBA-O || 16.94 || 2.3 km || multiple || 2000–2021 || 25 Nov 2021 || 107 || align=left | Disc.: Spacewatch || 
|- id="2000 WT202" bgcolor=#fefefe
| 0 ||  || MBA-I || 18.4 || data-sort-value="0.62" | 620 m || multiple || 2000–2019 || 02 Nov 2019 || 66 || align=left | Disc.: SDSS || 
|- id="2000 WV202" bgcolor=#fefefe
| 1 ||  || MBA-I || 18.0 || data-sort-value="0.75" | 750 m || multiple || 2000–2019 || 28 Nov 2019 || 57 || align=left | Disc.: Spacewatch || 
|- id="2000 WA203" bgcolor=#d6d6d6
| 0 ||  || MBA-O || 16.2 || 3.2 km || multiple || 2000–2021 || 11 Jun 2021 || 68 || align=left | Disc.: Spacewatch || 
|- id="2000 WB203" bgcolor=#E9E9E9
| 0 ||  || MBA-M || 16.9 || 1.8 km || multiple || 2000–2021 || 14 Jun 2021 || 68 || align=left | Disc.: SDSS || 
|- id="2000 WC203" bgcolor=#E9E9E9
| 0 ||  || MBA-M || 17.5 || 1.8 km || multiple || 2000–2020 || 22 Mar 2020 || 61 || align=left | Disc.: Spacewatch || 
|- id="2000 WD203" bgcolor=#E9E9E9
| 0 ||  || MBA-M || 17.44 || 1.8 km || multiple || 2000–2021 || 10 May 2021 || 69 || align=left | Disc.: Spacewatch || 
|- id="2000 WE203" bgcolor=#fefefe
| 0 ||  || MBA-I || 18.55 || data-sort-value="0.58" | 580 m || multiple || 2000–2022 || 23 Jan 2022 || 53 || align=left | Disc.: Spacewatch || 
|- id="2000 WG203" bgcolor=#fefefe
| 0 ||  || MBA-I || 17.6 || data-sort-value="0.90" | 900 m || multiple || 2000–2020 || 10 Dec 2020 || 60 || align=left | Disc.: Spacewatch || 
|- id="2000 WH203" bgcolor=#fefefe
| 0 ||  || MBA-I || 18.0 || data-sort-value="0.75" | 750 m || multiple || 2000–2020 || 14 Oct 2020 || 86 || align=left | Disc.: Spacewatch || 
|- id="2000 WK203" bgcolor=#E9E9E9
| 0 ||  || MBA-M || 17.87 || 1.1 km || multiple || 2000–2021 || 07 Jul 2021 || 52 || align=left | Disc.: Spacewatch || 
|- id="2000 WM203" bgcolor=#d6d6d6
| 0 ||  || MBA-O || 17.4 || 1.8 km || multiple || 2000–2020 || 17 Jul 2020 || 43 || align=left | Disc.: Spacewatch || 
|- id="2000 WO203" bgcolor=#d6d6d6
| 0 ||  || MBA-O || 16.79 || 2.4 km || multiple || 2000–2021 || 05 Jul 2021 || 64 || align=left | Disc.: Spacewatch || 
|- id="2000 WP203" bgcolor=#E9E9E9
| 0 ||  || MBA-M || 17.8 || 1.2 km || multiple || 2000–2020 || 22 Jun 2020 || 54 || align=left | Disc.: Spacewatch || 
|- id="2000 WR203" bgcolor=#E9E9E9
| 0 ||  || MBA-M || 17.95 || 1.1 km || multiple || 2000–2021 || 28 Nov 2021 || 84 || align=left | Disc.: SDSS || 
|- id="2000 WS203" bgcolor=#E9E9E9
| 0 ||  || MBA-M || 17.6 || 1.3 km || multiple || 2000–2018 || 15 Dec 2018 || 30 || align=left | Disc.: Spacewatch || 
|- id="2000 WT203" bgcolor=#E9E9E9
| 0 ||  || MBA-M || 17.99 || 1.1 km || multiple || 2000–2022 || 06 Jan 2022 || 95 || align=left | Disc.: Spacewatch || 
|- id="2000 WU203" bgcolor=#E9E9E9
| 3 ||  || MBA-M || 18.3 || data-sort-value="0.65" | 650 m || multiple || 2000–2020 || 05 Nov 2020 || 52 || align=left | Disc.: Spacewatch || 
|- id="2000 WV203" bgcolor=#d6d6d6
| 0 ||  || MBA-O || 16.50 || 2.8 km || multiple || 2000–2021 || 11 Nov 2021 || 132 || align=left | Disc.: SDSS || 
|- id="2000 WA204" bgcolor=#d6d6d6
| 0 ||  || MBA-O || 16.7 || 2.5 km || multiple || 2000–2022 || 10 Jan 2022 || 83 || align=left | Disc.: Spacewatch || 
|- id="2000 WC204" bgcolor=#E9E9E9
| 0 ||  || MBA-M || 17.99 || 1.1 km || multiple || 2000–2021 || 25 Nov 2021 || 85 || align=left | Disc.: SpacewatchAlt.: 2010 HL137 || 
|- id="2000 WD204" bgcolor=#d6d6d6
| 0 ||  || MBA-O || 16.87 || 2.4 km || multiple || 2000–2021 || 02 Dec 2021 || 117 || align=left | Disc.: SDSS || 
|- id="2000 WE204" bgcolor=#fefefe
| 0 ||  || MBA-I || 18.3 || data-sort-value="0.65" | 650 m || multiple || 2000–2019 || 27 Oct 2019 || 42 || align=left | Disc.: Spacewatch || 
|- id="2000 WH204" bgcolor=#E9E9E9
| 0 ||  || MBA-M || 17.7 || 1.2 km || multiple || 2000–2020 || 22 Apr 2020 || 39 || align=left | Disc.: Spacewatch || 
|- id="2000 WJ204" bgcolor=#d6d6d6
| 0 ||  || MBA-O || 17.36 || 1.9 km || multiple || 2000–2021 || 09 Nov 2021 || 58 || align=left | Disc.: Spacewatch || 
|- id="2000 WK204" bgcolor=#E9E9E9
| 0 ||  || MBA-M || 18.3 || data-sort-value="0.92" | 920 m || multiple || 2000–2020 || 27 Apr 2020 || 35 || align=left | Disc.: Spacewatch || 
|- id="2000 WL204" bgcolor=#E9E9E9
| 0 ||  || MBA-M || 17.5 || 1.8 km || multiple || 2000–2020 || 29 Apr 2020 || 39 || align=left | Disc.: SDSS || 
|- id="2000 WM204" bgcolor=#d6d6d6
| 0 ||  || MBA-O || 16.9 || 2.3 km || multiple || 2000–2020 || 22 Apr 2020 || 33 || align=left | Disc.: SDSS || 
|- id="2000 WN204" bgcolor=#d6d6d6
| 0 ||  || MBA-O || 16.04 || 3.4 km || multiple || 2000–2021 || 20 Apr 2021 || 100 || align=left | Disc.: SDSS || 
|- id="2000 WO204" bgcolor=#d6d6d6
| 0 ||  || MBA-O || 17.53 || 1.7 km || multiple || 2000–2021 || 15 Jan 2021 || 48 || align=left | Disc.: Spacewatch || 
|- id="2000 WQ204" bgcolor=#fefefe
| 0 ||  || MBA-I || 18.24 || data-sort-value="0.67" | 670 m || multiple || 2000–2021 || 18 Apr 2021 || 51 || align=left | Disc.: Spacewatch || 
|- id="2000 WR204" bgcolor=#fefefe
| 0 ||  || MBA-I || 18.42 || data-sort-value="0.62" | 620 m || multiple || 2000–2021 || 08 May 2021 || 42 || align=left | Disc.: Spacewatch || 
|- id="2000 WS204" bgcolor=#E9E9E9
| 0 ||  || MBA-M || 18.29 || data-sort-value="0.65" | 650 m || multiple || 2000–2022 || 27 Jan 2022 || 75 || align=left | Disc.: Spacewatch || 
|- id="2000 WT204" bgcolor=#d6d6d6
| 0 ||  || MBA-O || 17.04 || 2.2 km || multiple || 2000–2021 || 24 Nov 2021 || 84 || align=left | Disc.: Spacewatch || 
|- id="2000 WU204" bgcolor=#d6d6d6
| 0 ||  || MBA-O || 17.47 || 1.8 km || multiple || 2000–2021 || 10 Sep 2021 || 41 || align=left | Disc.: Spacewatch || 
|- id="2000 WV204" bgcolor=#d6d6d6
| 0 ||  || MBA-O || 17.69 || 1.6 km || multiple || 2000–2021 || 30 Oct 2021 || 57 || align=left | Disc.: SDSS || 
|- id="2000 WX204" bgcolor=#d6d6d6
| 0 ||  || MBA-O || 16.5 || 2.8 km || multiple || 2000–2020 || 25 May 2020 || 85 || align=left | Disc.: Spacewatch || 
|- id="2000 WY204" bgcolor=#fefefe
| 0 ||  || MBA-I || 18.41 || data-sort-value="0.62" | 620 m || multiple || 2000–2021 || 09 May 2021 || 60 || align=left | Disc.: Spacewatch || 
|- id="2000 WZ204" bgcolor=#E9E9E9
| 0 ||  || MBA-M || 17.06 || 2.2 km || multiple || 2000–2021 || 10 May 2021 || 80 || align=left | Disc.: Spacewatch || 
|- id="2000 WA205" bgcolor=#E9E9E9
| 0 ||  || MBA-M || 17.1 || 2.1 km || multiple || 2000–2020 || 19 Jan 2020 || 56 || align=left | Disc.: SDSS || 
|- id="2000 WB205" bgcolor=#fefefe
| 0 ||  || HUN || 18.05 || data-sort-value="0.73" | 730 m || multiple || 2000–2021 || 05 Dec 2021 || 131 || align=left | Disc.: Spacewatch || 
|- id="2000 WC205" bgcolor=#d6d6d6
| 0 ||  || MBA-O || 16.39 || 2.9 km || multiple || 2000–2021 || 14 Apr 2021 || 74 || align=left | Disc.: Spacewatch || 
|- id="2000 WD205" bgcolor=#d6d6d6
| 0 ||  || MBA-O || 16.8 || 2.4 km || multiple || 2000–2020 || 21 Mar 2020 || 48 || align=left | Disc.: SDSS || 
|- id="2000 WE205" bgcolor=#E9E9E9
| 1 ||  || MBA-M || 18.1 || data-sort-value="0.71" | 710 m || multiple || 2000–2021 || 05 Jan 2021 || 102 || align=left | Disc.: Spacewatch || 
|- id="2000 WF205" bgcolor=#d6d6d6
| 0 ||  || MBA-O || 16.85 || 2.4 km || multiple || 2000–2021 || 04 Oct 2021 || 83 || align=left | Disc.: Spacewatch || 
|- id="2000 WG205" bgcolor=#d6d6d6
| 0 ||  || MBA-O || 16.9 || 2.3 km || multiple || 2000–2020 || 14 Nov 2020 || 56 || align=left | Disc.: No observationsAdded on 22 July 2020 || 
|}
back to top

X 

|- id="2000 XG" bgcolor=#d6d6d6
| 0 || 2000 XG || MBA-O || 16.7 || 2.5 km || multiple || 2000–2020 || 24 Jun 2020 || 55 || align=left | Disc.: Spacewatch || 
|- id="2000 XL" bgcolor=#E9E9E9
| 2 || 2000 XL || MBA-M || 19.1 || data-sort-value="0.45" | 450 m || multiple || 2000–2020 || 22 Sep 2020 || 41 || align=left | Disc.: SpacewatchAdded on 22 July 2020Alt.: 2004 VF127, 2012 TH144 || 
|- id="2000 XN" bgcolor=#E9E9E9
| 1 || 2000 XN || MBA-M || 18.44 || data-sort-value="0.86" | 860 m || multiple || 2000–2021 || 07 Nov 2021 || 54 || align=left | Disc.: SpacewatchAlt.: 2017 VB8 || 
|- id="2000 XO8" bgcolor=#FFE699
| 0 ||  || Asteroid || 16.4 || 2.9 km || multiple || 2000–2018 || 14 Feb 2018 || 457 || align=left | Disc.: LINEARMCA at MPC || 
|- id="2000 XX10" bgcolor=#fefefe
| 0 ||  || MBA-I || 17.62 || data-sort-value="0.89" | 890 m || multiple || 1996–2021 || 19 Mar 2021 || 189 || align=left | Disc.: Xinglong StationAlt.: 1996 SN4, 2014 HL15, 2015 QK10 || 
|- id="2000 XL15" bgcolor=#d6d6d6
| 0 ||  || MBA-O || 17.1 || 2.1 km || multiple || 2000–2019 || 07 Apr 2019 || 65 || align=left | Disc.: Bohyunsan Obs.Alt.: 2013 CB13 || 
|- id="2000 XM15" bgcolor=#E9E9E9
| 1 ||  || MBA-M || 17.2 || 2.0 km || multiple || 2000–2020 || 21 Apr 2020 || 68 || align=left | Disc.: Bohyunsan Obs.Alt.: 2000 WY192, 2015 FA133, 2016 GW235 || 
|- id="2000 XQ15" bgcolor=#FA8072
| 0 ||  || MCA || 17.68 || data-sort-value="0.87" | 870 m || multiple || 2000–2022 || 05 Jan 2022 || 98 || align=left | Disc.: LINEARAlt.: 2014 WE367 || 
|- id="2000 XA44" bgcolor=#d6d6d6
| 0 ||  || MBA-O || 16.76 || 2.5 km || multiple || 2000–2021 || 02 Oct 2021 || 52 || align=left | Disc.: Bohyunsan Obs. || 
|- id="2000 XD44" bgcolor=#d6d6d6
| 0 ||  || MBA-O || 16.83 || 2.4 km || multiple || 2000–2021 || 09 Aug 2021 || 62 || align=left | Disc.: Bohyunsan Obs. || 
|- id="2000 XF44" bgcolor=#FFC2E0
| 6 ||  || AMO || 21.3 || data-sort-value="0.20" | 200 m || single || 26 days || 30 Dec 2000 || 31 || align=left | Disc.: AMOS || 
|- id="2000 XJ44" bgcolor=#FFC2E0
| 3 ||  || APO || 20.2 || data-sort-value="0.32" | 320 m || multiple || 2000–2019 || 18 Apr 2019 || 45 || align=left | Disc.: LINEAR || 
|- id="2000 XZ44" bgcolor=#FA8072
| 1 ||  || MCA || 17.4 || data-sort-value="0.98" | 980 m || multiple || 2000–2020 || 20 Feb 2020 || 137 || align=left | Disc.: LINEAR || 
|- id="2000 XL47" bgcolor=#FA8072
| 0 ||  || MCA || 17.28 || 1.0 km || multiple || 2000–2021 || 17 Dec 2021 || 112 || align=left | Disc.: LINEARAlt.: 2001 FA128 || 
|- id="2000 XA54" bgcolor=#fefefe
| 0 ||  || MBA-I || 19.9 || data-sort-value="0.31" | 310 m || multiple || 2000–2020 || 15 Sep 2020 || 27 || align=left | Disc.: Bohyunsan Obs. || 
|- id="2000 XQ54" bgcolor=#E9E9E9
| 1 ||  || MBA-M || 18.79 || data-sort-value="0.73" | 730 m || multiple || 2000–2021 || 30 Nov 2021 || 48 || align=left | Disc.: Bohyunsan Obs.Added on 24 December 2021 || 
|- id="2000 XS54" bgcolor=#E9E9E9
| 0 ||  || MBA-M || 17.8 || 1.2 km || multiple || 2000–2021 || 01 Nov 2021 || 32 || align=left | Disc.: Bohyunsan Obs.Added on 29 January 2022 || 
|- id="2000 XK55" bgcolor=#fefefe
| 0 ||  || MBA-I || 17.94 || data-sort-value="0.77" | 770 m || multiple || 2000–2021 || 09 Apr 2021 || 136 || align=left | Disc.: Spacewatch || 
|- id="2000 XS55" bgcolor=#d6d6d6
| 0 ||  || MBA-O || 16.3 || 3.1 km || multiple || 2000–2020 || 26 May 2020 || 116 || align=left | Disc.: Spacewatch || 
|- id="2000 XW55" bgcolor=#E9E9E9
| 0 ||  || MBA-M || 17.36 || 1.4 km || multiple || 2000–2021 || 27 Nov 2021 || 114 || align=left | Disc.: Spacewatch || 
|- id="2000 XZ55" bgcolor=#fefefe
| 0 ||  || MBA-I || 18.3 || data-sort-value="0.65" | 650 m || multiple || 2000–2021 || 18 Jan 2021 || 85 || align=left | Disc.: Spacewatch || 
|- id="2000 XA56" bgcolor=#d6d6d6
| 0 ||  || HIL || 15.6 || 4.2 km || multiple || 2000–2018 || 06 Mar 2018 || 48 || align=left | Disc.: Spacewatch || 
|- id="2000 XB56" bgcolor=#E9E9E9
| 0 ||  || MBA-M || 17.69 || 1.2 km || multiple || 2000–2021 || 14 Sep 2021 || 55 || align=left | Disc.: Spacewatch || 
|- id="2000 XC56" bgcolor=#E9E9E9
| 0 ||  || MBA-M || 17.89 || data-sort-value="0.79" | 790 m || multiple || 2000–2021 || 27 Dec 2021 || 50 || align=left | Disc.: Spacewatch || 
|- id="2000 XD56" bgcolor=#fefefe
| 0 ||  || MBA-I || 18.6 || data-sort-value="0.57" | 570 m || multiple || 2000–2020 || 21 Jan 2020 || 34 || align=left | Disc.: Spacewatch || 
|- id="2000 XE56" bgcolor=#d6d6d6
| 0 ||  || MBA-O || 16.9 || 2.3 km || multiple || 2000–2020 || 16 Apr 2020 || 32 || align=left | Disc.: Mauna Kea Obs. || 
|- id="2000 XF56" bgcolor=#E9E9E9
| 0 ||  || MBA-M || 17.5 || 1.8 km || multiple || 2000–2018 || 07 Sep 2018 || 43 || align=left | Disc.: Spacewatch || 
|- id="2000 XH56" bgcolor=#E9E9E9
| 0 ||  || MBA-M || 18.10 || 1.0 km || multiple || 2000–2021 || 10 Nov 2021 || 51 || align=left | Disc.: Spacewatch || 
|- id="2000 XJ56" bgcolor=#d6d6d6
| 0 ||  || MBA-O || 17.0 || 2.2 km || multiple || 2000–2017 || 14 Dec 2017 || 41 || align=left | Disc.: Spacewatch || 
|- id="2000 XK56" bgcolor=#fefefe
| 0 ||  || MBA-I || 18.45 || data-sort-value="0.61" | 610 m || multiple || 2000–2021 || 13 May 2021 || 43 || align=left | Disc.: Spacewatch || 
|- id="2000 XL56" bgcolor=#E9E9E9
| 1 ||  || MBA-M || 17.8 || data-sort-value="0.82" | 820 m || multiple || 2000–2020 || 16 Jun 2020 || 30 || align=left | Disc.: Spacewatch || 
|- id="2000 XM56" bgcolor=#E9E9E9
| 2 ||  || MBA-M || 17.5 || 1.8 km || multiple || 2000–2018 || 11 Nov 2018 || 42 || align=left | Disc.: Catalina Station || 
|- id="2000 XN56" bgcolor=#E9E9E9
| 0 ||  || MBA-M || 18.32 || data-sort-value="0.91" | 910 m || multiple || 2000–2021 || 08 Aug 2021 || 30 || align=left | Disc.: Spacewatch || 
|}
back to top

Y 

|- id="2000 YA" bgcolor=#FFC2E0
| 0 || 2000 YA || APO || 23.7 || data-sort-value="0.065" | 65 m || multiple || 2000–2011 || 27 Dec 2011 || 166 || align=left | Disc.: LONEOS || 
|- id="2000 YV1" bgcolor=#C2E0FF
| 4 ||  || TNO || 7.24 || 118 km || multiple || 2000–2020 || 09 Dec 2020 || 23 || align=left | Disc.: Kitt PeakLoUTNOs, cubewano (cold) || 
|- id="2000 YW1" bgcolor=#C2E0FF
| E ||  || TNO || 7.0 || 137 km || single || 2 days || 18 Dec 2000 || 5 || align=left | Disc.: Kitt PeakLoUTNOs, cubewano? || 
|- id="2000 YX1" bgcolor=#C2E0FF
| 4 ||  || TNO || 7.06 || 129 km || multiple || 2000–2021 || 11 Jan 2021 || 22 || align=left | Disc.: Kitt PeakLoUTNOs, cubewano (cold) || 
|- id="2000 YY1" bgcolor=#C2E0FF
| 7 ||  || TNO || 7.1 || 212 km || multiple || 2000–2001 || 13 Dec 2001 || 10 || align=left | Disc.: Kitt PeakLoUTNOs, centaur || 
|- id="2000 YZ1" bgcolor=#C2E0FF
| E ||  || TNO || 7.9 || 90 km || multiple || 2000–2001 || 09 Nov 2001 || 9 || align=left | Disc.: Kitt PeakLoUTNOs, cubewano? || 
|- id="2000 YA2" bgcolor=#C2E0FF
| 4 ||  || TNO || 7.0 || 132 km || multiple || 2000–2013 || 06 Nov 2013 || 18 || align=left | Disc.: Kitt PeakLoUTNOs, cubewano (cold) || 
|- id="2000 YD2" bgcolor=#C2E0FF
| E ||  || TNO || 7.9 || 109 km || single || 1 day || 18 Dec 2000 || 4 || align=left | Disc.: Kitt PeakLoUTNOs, other TNO || 
|- id="2000 YE2" bgcolor=#C2E0FF
| 5 ||  || TNO || 8.26 || 81 km || multiple || 2000–2021 || 11 Jan 2021 || 15 || align=left | Disc.: Kitt PeakLoUTNOs, twotino || 
|- id="2000 YF2" bgcolor=#C2E0FF
| 3 ||  || TNO || 7.0 || 132 km || multiple || 2000–2016 || 04 Feb 2016 || 22 || align=left | Disc.: Kitt PeakLoUTNOs, cubewano (cold) || 
|- id="2000 YG2" bgcolor=#C2E0FF
| E ||  || TNO || 7.7 || 120 km || single || 1 day || 18 Dec 2000 || 4 || align=left | Disc.: Kitt PeakLoUTNOs, other TNO || 
|- id="2000 YH2" bgcolor=#C2E0FF
| 2 ||  || TNO || 7.82 || 129 km || multiple || 2000–2021 || 08 Jan 2021 || 37 || align=left | Disc.: Kitt PeakLoUTNOs, plutino || 
|- id="2000 YF3" bgcolor=#fefefe
| 0 ||  || MBA-I || 18.46 || data-sort-value="0.60" | 600 m || multiple || 2000–2021 || 12 Jun 2021 || 64 || align=left | Disc.: SpacewatchAlt.: 2005 BY26 || 
|- id="2000 YF4" bgcolor=#FA8072
| – ||  || HUN || 21.9 || data-sort-value="0.12" | 120 m || single || 5 days || 22 Dec 2000 || 8 || align=left | Disc.: Mauna Kea Obs. || 
|- id="2000 YG4" bgcolor=#FFC2E0
| 3 ||  || AMO || 20.8 || data-sort-value="0.25" | 250 m || single || 156 days || 22 May 2001 || 121 || align=left | Disc.: Spacewatch || 
|- id="2000 YJ4" bgcolor=#FA8072
| 2 ||  || MCA || 18.3 || data-sort-value="0.92" | 920 m || multiple || 2000–2013 || 28 Dec 2013 || 75 || align=left | Disc.: LINEARAlt.: 2013 YD21 || 
|- id="2000 YL4" bgcolor=#FA8072
| 2 ||  || MCA || 19.0 || data-sort-value="0.47" | 470 m || multiple || 1996–2009 || 17 Mar 2009 || 90 || align=left | Disc.: LINEAR || 
|- id="2000 YD16" bgcolor=#d6d6d6
| 0 ||  || MBA-O || 16.58 || 2.7 km || multiple || 2000–2021 || 22 May 2021 || 47 || align=left | Disc.: Bohyunsan Obs. || 
|- id="2000 YY16" bgcolor=#E9E9E9
| 1 ||  || MBA-M || 17.2 || 1.1 km || multiple || 2000–2021 || 02 Dec 2021 || 43 || align=left | Disc.: LINEAR || 
|- id="2000 YD20" bgcolor=#fefefe
| 0 ||  || MBA-I || 16.6 || 1.4 km || multiple || 2000–2021 || 19 Jan 2021 || 220 || align=left | Disc.: SpacewatchAlt.: 2015 TL264, 2017 BK70 || 
|- id="2000 YR20" bgcolor=#fefefe
| 0 ||  || MBA-I || 17.81 || data-sort-value="0.81" | 810 m || multiple || 2000–2021 || 08 Sep 2021 || 159 || align=left | Disc.: SpacewatchAlt.: 2018 VB38 || 
|- id="2000 YC21" bgcolor=#d6d6d6
| 0 ||  || MBA-O || 17.07 || 2.1 km || multiple || 2000–2022 || 07 Jan 2022 || 72 || align=left | Disc.: Spacewatch || 
|- id="2000 YM22" bgcolor=#E9E9E9
| 0 ||  || MBA-M || 17.65 || 1.2 km || multiple || 2000–2021 || 13 Sep 2021 || 51 || align=left | Disc.: SpacewatchAdded on 30 September 2021 || 
|- id="2000 YJ23" bgcolor=#E9E9E9
| 0 ||  || MBA-M || 17.9 || 1.1 km || multiple || 2000–2018 || 13 Jan 2018 || 45 || align=left | Disc.: SpacewatchAlt.: 2010 EB82 || 
|- id="2000 YN25" bgcolor=#E9E9E9
| 0 ||  || MBA-M || 17.39 || 1.9 km || multiple || 2000–2021 || 09 Aug 2021 || 91 || align=left | Disc.: SpacewatchAdded on 22 July 2020Alt.: 2015 FX289 || 
|- id="2000 YM27" bgcolor=#E9E9E9
| 0 ||  || MBA-M || 16.90 || 2.3 km || multiple || 2000–2021 || 15 Jun 2021 || 148 || align=left | Disc.: SpacewatchAlt.: 2018 WT3 || 
|- id="2000 YB29" bgcolor=#C2E0FF
| E ||  || TNO || 7.9 || 124 km || single || 11 days || 01 Jan 2001 || 6 || align=left | Disc.: Mauna Kea Obs.LoUTNOs, plutino?, BR-mag: 1.50 || 
|- id="2000 YG29" bgcolor=#FFC2E0
| 0 ||  || APO || 18.7 || data-sort-value="0.65" | 650 m || multiple || 2000–2018 || 09 May 2018 || 197 || align=left | Disc.: LONEOSPotentially hazardous objectAMO at MPC || 
|- id="2000 YT37" bgcolor=#E9E9E9
| 0 ||  || MBA-M || 17.49 || 1.3 km || multiple || 2000–2021 || 26 Oct 2021 || 97 || align=left | Disc.: LINEARAlt.: 2017 TG10 || 
|- id="2000 YW100" bgcolor=#E9E9E9
| 0 ||  || MBA-M || 16.4 || 1.6 km || multiple || 2000–2021 || 18 Jan 2021 || 156 || align=left | Disc.: AMOSAlt.: 2014 MF29 || 
|- id="2000 YV118" bgcolor=#fefefe
| 0 ||  || MBA-I || 18.0 || data-sort-value="0.75" | 750 m || multiple || 1993–2021 || 04 Jan 2021 || 109 || align=left | Disc.: Piszkéstető StationAlt.: 2015 HF144, 2016 RG35 || 
|- id="2000 YN133" bgcolor=#E9E9E9
| 0 ||  || MBA-M || 17.93 || 1.1 km || multiple || 2000–2022 || 27 Jan 2022 || 71 || align=left | Disc.: Spacewatch || 
|- id="2000 YS134" bgcolor=#FFC2E0
| 8 ||  || ATE || 23.1 || data-sort-value="0.085" | 85 m || single || 60 days || 28 Feb 2001 || 18 || align=left | Disc.: LINEAR || 
|- id="2000 YT134" bgcolor=#FFC2E0
| 1 ||  || AMO || 18.7 || data-sort-value="0.65" | 650 m || multiple || 2000–2007 || 09 Mar 2007 || 89 || align=left | Disc.: LONEOS || 
|- id="2000 YV140" bgcolor=#d6d6d6
| 0 ||  || MBA-O || 16.64 || 2.6 km || multiple || 2000–2021 || 06 Nov 2021 || 135 || align=left | Disc.: Kitt PeakAlt.: 2010 TX121, 2011 YD28 || 
|- id="2000 YW140" bgcolor=#d6d6d6
| 0 ||  || MBA-O || 17.1 || 2.1 km || multiple || 2000–2021 || 08 Nov 2021 || 43 || align=left | Disc.: Kitt PeakAdded on 24 December 2021 || 
|- id="2000 YX140" bgcolor=#d6d6d6
| 0 ||  || MBA-O || 17.0 || 2.2 km || multiple || 2000–2019 || 03 Dec 2019 || 64 || align=left | Disc.: Kitt Peak || 
|- id="2000 YC141" bgcolor=#d6d6d6
| 0 ||  || MBA-O || 17.19 || 2.0 km || multiple || 2000–2021 || 02 Oct 2021 || 54 || align=left | Disc.: Kitt Peak || 
|- id="2000 YE141" bgcolor=#d6d6d6
| 0 ||  || MBA-O || 16.5 || 2.8 km || multiple || 2000–2020 || 27 Apr 2020 || 92 || align=left | Disc.: Kitt PeakAdded on 30 September 2021Alt.: 2011 SE176 || 
|- id="2000 YL141" bgcolor=#d6d6d6
| 0 ||  || MBA-O || 16.5 || 2.8 km || multiple || 2000–2021 || 19 Jun 2021 || 80 || align=left | Disc.: Kitt Peak || 
|- id="2000 YM141" bgcolor=#fefefe
| 0 ||  || MBA-I || 17.98 || 1.8 km || multiple || 2000–2021 || 08 Nov 2021 || 101 || align=left | Disc.: Kitt Peak || 
|- id="2000 YN141" bgcolor=#d6d6d6
| E ||  || HIL || 17.6 || 1.7 km || single || 2 days || 22 Dec 2000 || 14 || align=left | Disc.: Kitt Peak || 
|- id="2000 YU141" bgcolor=#d6d6d6
| 0 ||  || MBA-O || 17.7 || 1.6 km || multiple || 2000–2020 || 02 Feb 2020 || 52 || align=left | Disc.: Kitt PeakAdded on 22 July 2020 || 
|- id="2000 YQ142" bgcolor=#C2E0FF
| E ||  || TNO || 7.6 || 143 km || single || 2 days || 24 Dec 2000 || 5 || align=left | Disc.: Mauna Kea Obs.LoUTNOs, plutino? || 
|- id="2000 YY142" bgcolor=#C2E0FF
| E ||  || TNO || 7.3 || 119 km || single || 1 day || 24 Dec 2000 || 3 || align=left | Disc.: Mauna Kea Obs.LoUTNOs, cubewano? || 
|- id="2000 YH144" bgcolor=#E9E9E9
| 0 ||  || MBA-M || 16.74 || 1.9 km || multiple || 2000–2022 || 27 Jan 2022 || 144 || align=left | Disc.: LONEOSAlt.: 2010 LG11 || 
|- id="2000 YM144" bgcolor=#E9E9E9
| 0 ||  || MBA-M || 17.48 || 1.3 km || multiple || 2000–2021 || 27 Nov 2021 || 98 || align=left | Disc.: Spacewatch || 
|- id="2000 YN144" bgcolor=#fefefe
| 0 ||  || MBA-I || 18.2 || data-sort-value="0.68" | 680 m || multiple || 2000–2021 || 08 Jan 2021 || 84 || align=left | Disc.: Spacewatch || 
|- id="2000 YQ144" bgcolor=#d6d6d6
| 0 ||  || MBA-O || 16.59 || 2.7 km || multiple || 2000–2021 || 26 Oct 2021 || 109 || align=left | Disc.: Spacewatch || 
|- id="2000 YT144" bgcolor=#d6d6d6
| 0 ||  || MBA-O || 16.70 || 2.5 km || multiple || 2000–2021 || 11 Oct 2021 || 58 || align=left | Disc.: Spacewatch || 
|- id="2000 YV144" bgcolor=#fefefe
| 0 ||  = (619223) || MBA-I || 17.7 || data-sort-value="0.86" | 860 m || multiple || 2000–2021 || 04 Aug 2021 || 99 || align=left | Disc.: SDSSAlt.: 2003 UV448 || 
|- id="2000 YY144" bgcolor=#FA8072
| 0 ||  || MCA || 18.4 || data-sort-value="0.62" | 620 m || multiple || 2000–2020 || 22 Dec 2020 || 54 || align=left | Disc.: Spacewatch || 
|- id="2000 YZ144" bgcolor=#d6d6d6
| 0 ||  || MBA-O || 17.1 || 2.1 km || multiple || 2000–2021 || 04 Jan 2021 || 84 || align=left | Disc.: Bohyunsan Obs. || 
|- id="2000 YA145" bgcolor=#fefefe
| 0 ||  || MBA-I || 18.01 || data-sort-value="0.74" | 740 m || multiple || 2000–2021 || 04 Oct 2021 || 92 || align=left | Disc.: Spacewatch || 
|- id="2000 YC145" bgcolor=#fefefe
| 0 ||  || MBA-I || 18.3 || data-sort-value="0.65" | 650 m || multiple || 2000–2021 || 04 Jan 2021 || 55 || align=left | Disc.: Spacewatch || 
|- id="2000 YE145" bgcolor=#E9E9E9
| 0 ||  || MBA-M || 17.2 || 1.1 km || multiple || 2000–2020 || 14 Nov 2020 || 118 || align=left | Disc.: SDSS || 
|- id="2000 YH145" bgcolor=#d6d6d6
| 0 ||  || MBA-O || 17.1 || 2.1 km || multiple || 1995–2020 || 22 Nov 2020 || 66 || align=left | Disc.: Kitt PeakAlt.: 2013 HY92 || 
|- id="2000 YL145" bgcolor=#fefefe
| 1 ||  || MBA-I || 18.8 || data-sort-value="0.52" | 520 m || multiple || 2000–2016 || 03 Nov 2016 || 31 || align=left | Disc.: Spacewatch || 
|- id="2000 YM145" bgcolor=#fefefe
| 0 ||  || MBA-I || 17.5 || data-sort-value="0.94" | 940 m || multiple || 2000–2020 || 09 Dec 2020 || 43 || align=left | Disc.: AMOS || 
|- id="2000 YN145" bgcolor=#fefefe
| 1 ||  || MBA-I || 18.9 || data-sort-value="0.49" | 490 m || multiple || 2000–2019 || 20 Dec 2019 || 68 || align=left | Disc.: Spacewatch || 
|- id="2000 YQ145" bgcolor=#FA8072
| 0 ||  = (619224) || HUN || 18.6 || data-sort-value="0.57" | 570 m || multiple || 2000–2019 || 01 Sep 2019 || 96 || align=left | Disc.: Spacewatch || 
|- id="2000 YR145" bgcolor=#E9E9E9
| 0 ||  || MBA-M || 17.01 || 2.2 km || multiple || 2000–2021 || 06 Nov 2021 || 92 || align=left | Disc.: SDSS || 
|- id="2000 YS145" bgcolor=#d6d6d6
| 1 ||  || MBA-O || 17.0 || 2.2 km || multiple || 2000–2021 || 12 Jan 2021 || 70 || align=left | Disc.: Spacewatch || 
|- id="2000 YT145" bgcolor=#E9E9E9
| 0 ||  || MBA-M || 17.09 || 2.1 km || multiple || 2000–2021 || 13 May 2021 || 74 || align=left | Disc.: Kitt Peak || 
|- id="2000 YV145" bgcolor=#fefefe
| 0 ||  || MBA-I || 18.19 || data-sort-value="0.68" | 680 m || multiple || 2000–2021 || 06 Nov 2021 || 147 || align=left | Disc.: Spacewatch || 
|- id="2000 YW145" bgcolor=#d6d6d6
| 0 ||  || MBA-O || 16.79 || 2.4 km || multiple || 2000–2021 || 31 Oct 2021 || 74 || align=left | Disc.: Spacewatch || 
|- id="2000 YX145" bgcolor=#d6d6d6
| 0 ||  || MBA-O || 16.73 || 2.5 km || multiple || 2000–2021 || 28 Oct 2021 || 69 || align=left | Disc.: Spacewatch || 
|- id="2000 YY145" bgcolor=#d6d6d6
| 0 ||  || MBA-O || 16.30 || 3.1 km || multiple || 2000–2021 || 07 Nov 2021 || 99 || align=left | Disc.: Spacewatch || 
|- id="2000 YA146" bgcolor=#E9E9E9
| 0 ||  || MBA-M || 17.50 || 1.8 km || multiple || 2000–2021 || 18 Apr 2021 || 58 || align=left | Disc.: Spacewatch || 
|- id="2000 YB146" bgcolor=#d6d6d6
| 0 ||  || MBA-O || 16.91 || 2.3 km || multiple || 2000–2021 || 01 Nov 2021 || 57 || align=left | Disc.: Spacewatch || 
|- id="2000 YC146" bgcolor=#E9E9E9
| 0 ||  || MBA-M || 17.41 || 1.4 km || multiple || 2000–2022 || 18 Jan 2022 || 115 || align=left | Disc.: Spacewatch || 
|- id="2000 YD146" bgcolor=#fefefe
| 0 ||  || MBA-I || 18.83 || data-sort-value="0.51" | 510 m || multiple || 2000–2022 || 27 Jan 2022 || 76 || align=left | Disc.: Spacewatch || 
|- id="2000 YE146" bgcolor=#fefefe
| 0 ||  || MBA-I || 18.87 || data-sort-value="0.50" | 500 m || multiple || 2000–2021 || 08 Aug 2021 || 48 || align=left | Disc.: Spacewatch || 
|- id="2000 YG146" bgcolor=#d6d6d6
| 0 ||  || MBA-O || 17.15 || 2.1 km || multiple || 2000–2021 || 14 May 2021 || 62 || align=left | Disc.: Spacewatch || 
|- id="2000 YM146" bgcolor=#fefefe
| 0 ||  || MBA-I || 18.61 || data-sort-value="0.56" | 560 m || multiple || 2000–2022 || 06 Jan 2022 || 79 || align=left | Disc.: Spacewatch || 
|- id="2000 YN146" bgcolor=#fefefe
| 0 ||  || MBA-I || 18.0 || data-sort-value="0.75" | 750 m || multiple || 2000–2019 || 28 Nov 2019 || 43 || align=left | Disc.: Kitt Peak || 
|- id="2000 YO146" bgcolor=#fefefe
| 0 ||  || MBA-I || 18.4 || data-sort-value="0.62" | 620 m || multiple || 2000–2020 || 02 Feb 2020 || 84 || align=left | Disc.: Spacewatch || 
|- id="2000 YP146" bgcolor=#d6d6d6
| 0 ||  || MBA-O || 17.1 || 2.1 km || multiple || 2000–2021 || 15 May 2021 || 96 || align=left | Disc.: Spacewatch || 
|- id="2000 YQ146" bgcolor=#fefefe
| 0 ||  || MBA-I || 18.5 || data-sort-value="0.59" | 590 m || multiple || 2000–2020 || 23 Oct 2020 || 68 || align=left | Disc.: Spacewatch || 
|- id="2000 YR146" bgcolor=#fefefe
| 0 ||  || MBA-I || 18.8 || data-sort-value="0.52" | 520 m || multiple || 2000–2019 || 24 Dec 2019 || 35 || align=left | Disc.: Spacewatch || 
|}
back to top

References 
 

Lists of unnumbered minor planets